

577001–577100 

|-bgcolor=#d6d6d6
| 577001 ||  || — || November 18, 2006 || Kitt Peak || Spacewatch ||  || align=right | 4.3 km || 
|-id=002 bgcolor=#d6d6d6
| 577002 ||  || — || December 1, 2002 || Eskridge || G. Hug ||  || align=right | 3.4 km || 
|-id=003 bgcolor=#d6d6d6
| 577003 ||  || — || September 25, 2006 || Catalina || CSS ||  || align=right | 3.8 km || 
|-id=004 bgcolor=#d6d6d6
| 577004 ||  || — || January 14, 2008 || Kitt Peak || Spacewatch ||  || align=right | 2.9 km || 
|-id=005 bgcolor=#d6d6d6
| 577005 ||  || — || December 3, 2012 || Mount Lemmon || Mount Lemmon Survey ||  || align=right | 2.6 km || 
|-id=006 bgcolor=#d6d6d6
| 577006 ||  || — || December 6, 2012 || Nogales || M. Schwartz, P. R. Holvorcem ||  || align=right | 2.9 km || 
|-id=007 bgcolor=#d6d6d6
| 577007 ||  || — || January 12, 2008 || Kitt Peak || Spacewatch ||  || align=right | 2.1 km || 
|-id=008 bgcolor=#d6d6d6
| 577008 ||  || — || December 3, 2012 || Mount Lemmon || Mount Lemmon Survey ||  || align=right | 2.7 km || 
|-id=009 bgcolor=#d6d6d6
| 577009 ||  || — || December 4, 2012 || Mount Lemmon || Mount Lemmon Survey ||  || align=right | 2.4 km || 
|-id=010 bgcolor=#d6d6d6
| 577010 ||  || — || April 14, 2004 || Kitt Peak || Spacewatch ||  || align=right | 3.4 km || 
|-id=011 bgcolor=#d6d6d6
| 577011 ||  || — || December 30, 2007 || Kitt Peak || Spacewatch ||  || align=right | 3.0 km || 
|-id=012 bgcolor=#d6d6d6
| 577012 ||  || — || December 13, 2012 || Kitt Peak || Spacewatch ||  || align=right | 3.6 km || 
|-id=013 bgcolor=#d6d6d6
| 577013 ||  || — || October 5, 2002 || Palomar || NEAT || BRA || align=right | 1.6 km || 
|-id=014 bgcolor=#E9E9E9
| 577014 ||  || — || September 11, 2007 || Mount Lemmon || Mount Lemmon Survey ||  || align=right | 1.5 km || 
|-id=015 bgcolor=#d6d6d6
| 577015 ||  || — || March 18, 2004 || Kitt Peak || Spacewatch || TEL || align=right | 1.9 km || 
|-id=016 bgcolor=#d6d6d6
| 577016 ||  || — || December 12, 2012 || Oukaimeden || M. Ory ||  || align=right | 2.9 km || 
|-id=017 bgcolor=#d6d6d6
| 577017 ||  || — || February 12, 2008 || Mount Lemmon || Mount Lemmon Survey ||  || align=right | 3.1 km || 
|-id=018 bgcolor=#fefefe
| 577018 ||  || — || December 4, 2012 || Mount Lemmon || Mount Lemmon Survey ||  || align=right data-sort-value="0.58" | 580 m || 
|-id=019 bgcolor=#d6d6d6
| 577019 ||  || — || December 9, 2012 || Piszkesteto || K. Sárneczky ||  || align=right | 3.2 km || 
|-id=020 bgcolor=#d6d6d6
| 577020 ||  || — || March 22, 2003 || Palomar || NEAT ||  || align=right | 4.3 km || 
|-id=021 bgcolor=#d6d6d6
| 577021 ||  || — || February 24, 2014 || Haleakala || Pan-STARRS ||  || align=right | 2.1 km || 
|-id=022 bgcolor=#fefefe
| 577022 ||  || — || April 9, 2014 || Kitt Peak || Spacewatch ||  || align=right data-sort-value="0.48" | 480 m || 
|-id=023 bgcolor=#E9E9E9
| 577023 ||  || — || November 19, 2016 || Mount Lemmon || Mount Lemmon Survey ||  || align=right data-sort-value="0.90" | 900 m || 
|-id=024 bgcolor=#d6d6d6
| 577024 ||  || — || February 10, 2014 || Haleakala || Pan-STARRS ||  || align=right | 2.2 km || 
|-id=025 bgcolor=#d6d6d6
| 577025 ||  || — || February 26, 2014 || Mount Lemmon || Mount Lemmon Survey ||  || align=right | 2.2 km || 
|-id=026 bgcolor=#d6d6d6
| 577026 ||  || — || January 31, 2014 || Haleakala || Pan-STARRS ||  || align=right | 2.2 km || 
|-id=027 bgcolor=#d6d6d6
| 577027 ||  || — || December 3, 2012 || Mount Lemmon || Mount Lemmon Survey ||  || align=right | 2.0 km || 
|-id=028 bgcolor=#d6d6d6
| 577028 ||  || — || December 4, 2012 || Mount Lemmon || Mount Lemmon Survey ||  || align=right | 2.3 km || 
|-id=029 bgcolor=#d6d6d6
| 577029 ||  || — || December 3, 2012 || Mount Lemmon || Mount Lemmon Survey ||  || align=right | 2.1 km || 
|-id=030 bgcolor=#d6d6d6
| 577030 ||  || — || December 2, 2012 || Mount Lemmon || Mount Lemmon Survey ||  || align=right | 2.4 km || 
|-id=031 bgcolor=#d6d6d6
| 577031 ||  || — || December 11, 2012 || Mount Lemmon || Mount Lemmon Survey ||  || align=right | 2.5 km || 
|-id=032 bgcolor=#FA8072
| 577032 ||  || — || November 13, 2012 || Mount Lemmon || Mount Lemmon Survey ||  || align=right data-sort-value="0.48" | 480 m || 
|-id=033 bgcolor=#d6d6d6
| 577033 ||  || — || December 21, 2012 || Mount Lemmon || Mount Lemmon Survey ||  || align=right | 3.4 km || 
|-id=034 bgcolor=#d6d6d6
| 577034 ||  || — || August 2, 2016 || Haleakala || Pan-STARRS ||  || align=right | 3.1 km || 
|-id=035 bgcolor=#d6d6d6
| 577035 ||  || — || December 23, 2012 || Haleakala || Pan-STARRS ||  || align=right | 2.5 km || 
|-id=036 bgcolor=#E9E9E9
| 577036 ||  || — || December 23, 2012 || Haleakala || Pan-STARRS ||  || align=right | 2.0 km || 
|-id=037 bgcolor=#d6d6d6
| 577037 ||  || — || December 23, 2012 || Haleakala || Pan-STARRS ||  || align=right | 2.3 km || 
|-id=038 bgcolor=#d6d6d6
| 577038 ||  || — || December 23, 2012 || Haleakala || Pan-STARRS ||  || align=right | 2.3 km || 
|-id=039 bgcolor=#fefefe
| 577039 ||  || — || December 22, 2012 || Haleakala || Pan-STARRS || H || align=right data-sort-value="0.49" | 490 m || 
|-id=040 bgcolor=#d6d6d6
| 577040 ||  || — || December 23, 2012 || Haleakala || Pan-STARRS ||  || align=right | 2.4 km || 
|-id=041 bgcolor=#d6d6d6
| 577041 ||  || — || December 23, 2012 || Haleakala || Pan-STARRS ||  || align=right | 2.8 km || 
|-id=042 bgcolor=#d6d6d6
| 577042 ||  || — || December 23, 2012 || Haleakala || Pan-STARRS ||  || align=right | 2.3 km || 
|-id=043 bgcolor=#d6d6d6
| 577043 ||  || — || December 23, 2012 || Haleakala || Pan-STARRS ||  || align=right | 2.3 km || 
|-id=044 bgcolor=#d6d6d6
| 577044 ||  || — || December 22, 2012 || Haleakala || Pan-STARRS ||  || align=right | 2.1 km || 
|-id=045 bgcolor=#E9E9E9
| 577045 ||  || — || December 23, 2012 || Haleakala || Pan-STARRS ||  || align=right | 1.1 km || 
|-id=046 bgcolor=#d6d6d6
| 577046 ||  || — || December 12, 2006 || Palomar || NEAT || TIR || align=right | 2.9 km || 
|-id=047 bgcolor=#d6d6d6
| 577047 ||  || — || January 3, 2013 || Mount Lemmon || Mount Lemmon Survey ||  || align=right | 2.8 km || 
|-id=048 bgcolor=#d6d6d6
| 577048 ||  || — || January 3, 2013 || Mount Lemmon || Mount Lemmon Survey ||  || align=right | 3.1 km || 
|-id=049 bgcolor=#d6d6d6
| 577049 ||  || — || November 7, 2012 || Mount Lemmon || Mount Lemmon Survey ||  || align=right | 2.0 km || 
|-id=050 bgcolor=#d6d6d6
| 577050 ||  || — || January 3, 2013 || Oukaimeden || C. Rinner ||  || align=right | 2.2 km || 
|-id=051 bgcolor=#d6d6d6
| 577051 ||  || — || February 11, 2008 || Mount Lemmon || Mount Lemmon Survey ||  || align=right | 2.4 km || 
|-id=052 bgcolor=#d6d6d6
| 577052 ||  || — || October 23, 2011 || Haleakala || Pan-STARRS ||  || align=right | 3.1 km || 
|-id=053 bgcolor=#fefefe
| 577053 ||  || — || January 3, 2013 || Haleakala || Pan-STARRS ||  || align=right data-sort-value="0.71" | 710 m || 
|-id=054 bgcolor=#d6d6d6
| 577054 ||  || — || January 5, 2013 || Mount Lemmon || Mount Lemmon Survey ||  || align=right | 2.6 km || 
|-id=055 bgcolor=#d6d6d6
| 577055 ||  || — || September 17, 2006 || Catalina || CSS ||  || align=right | 2.7 km || 
|-id=056 bgcolor=#fefefe
| 577056 ||  || — || December 21, 2006 || Kitt Peak || L. H. Wasserman ||  || align=right data-sort-value="0.76" | 760 m || 
|-id=057 bgcolor=#d6d6d6
| 577057 ||  || — || December 11, 2012 || Mount Lemmon || Mount Lemmon Survey ||  || align=right | 3.4 km || 
|-id=058 bgcolor=#d6d6d6
| 577058 ||  || — || December 13, 2012 || Kitt Peak || Spacewatch ||  || align=right | 2.9 km || 
|-id=059 bgcolor=#C2FFFF
| 577059 ||  || — || January 3, 2013 || Haleakala || Pan-STARRS || L4 || align=right | 11 km || 
|-id=060 bgcolor=#d6d6d6
| 577060 ||  || — || January 7, 2013 || Oukaimeden || M. Ory ||  || align=right | 3.4 km || 
|-id=061 bgcolor=#d6d6d6
| 577061 ||  || — || January 7, 2013 || Mount Lemmon || Mount Lemmon Survey ||  || align=right | 2.8 km || 
|-id=062 bgcolor=#d6d6d6
| 577062 ||  || — || August 24, 2011 || Haleakala || Pan-STARRS ||  || align=right | 2.5 km || 
|-id=063 bgcolor=#d6d6d6
| 577063 ||  || — || November 13, 2012 || Mount Lemmon || Mount Lemmon Survey ||  || align=right | 3.2 km || 
|-id=064 bgcolor=#d6d6d6
| 577064 ||  || — || February 11, 2008 || Mount Lemmon || Mount Lemmon Survey ||  || align=right | 2.3 km || 
|-id=065 bgcolor=#E9E9E9
| 577065 ||  || — || January 4, 2013 || Mount Lemmon || Mount Lemmon Survey ||  || align=right | 1.9 km || 
|-id=066 bgcolor=#d6d6d6
| 577066 ||  || — || December 23, 2012 || Haleakala || Pan-STARRS ||  || align=right | 2.7 km || 
|-id=067 bgcolor=#C2FFFF
| 577067 ||  || — || September 27, 2012 || Haleakala || Pan-STARRS || L4 || align=right | 8.4 km || 
|-id=068 bgcolor=#fefefe
| 577068 ||  || — || December 19, 2001 || Socorro || LINEAR ||  || align=right data-sort-value="0.82" | 820 m || 
|-id=069 bgcolor=#fefefe
| 577069 ||  || — || January 5, 2013 || Kitt Peak || Spacewatch ||  || align=right data-sort-value="0.61" | 610 m || 
|-id=070 bgcolor=#C2FFFF
| 577070 ||  || — || November 5, 2010 || Mount Lemmon || Mount Lemmon Survey || L4 || align=right | 8.0 km || 
|-id=071 bgcolor=#fefefe
| 577071 ||  || — || January 5, 2013 || Kitt Peak || Spacewatch ||  || align=right data-sort-value="0.72" | 720 m || 
|-id=072 bgcolor=#E9E9E9
| 577072 ||  || — || September 23, 2011 || Haleakala || Pan-STARRS ||  || align=right | 2.1 km || 
|-id=073 bgcolor=#d6d6d6
| 577073 ||  || — || February 7, 2002 || Palomar || NEAT ||  || align=right | 3.5 km || 
|-id=074 bgcolor=#d6d6d6
| 577074 ||  || — || January 6, 2013 || Mount Lemmon || Mount Lemmon Survey ||  || align=right | 2.4 km || 
|-id=075 bgcolor=#d6d6d6
| 577075 ||  || — || January 19, 2008 || Mount Lemmon || Mount Lemmon Survey ||  || align=right | 3.1 km || 
|-id=076 bgcolor=#d6d6d6
| 577076 ||  || — || January 6, 2013 || Mount Lemmon || Mount Lemmon Survey ||  || align=right | 1.9 km || 
|-id=077 bgcolor=#d6d6d6
| 577077 ||  || — || December 21, 2012 || Catalina || CSS ||  || align=right | 3.5 km || 
|-id=078 bgcolor=#d6d6d6
| 577078 ||  || — || October 19, 2011 || Mount Lemmon || Mount Lemmon Survey ||  || align=right | 2.5 km || 
|-id=079 bgcolor=#d6d6d6
| 577079 ||  || — || September 30, 2011 || Kitt Peak || Spacewatch ||  || align=right | 3.2 km || 
|-id=080 bgcolor=#d6d6d6
| 577080 ||  || — || December 19, 2007 || Kitt Peak || Spacewatch ||  || align=right | 2.3 km || 
|-id=081 bgcolor=#d6d6d6
| 577081 ||  || — || December 23, 2012 || Haleakala || Pan-STARRS ||  || align=right | 2.8 km || 
|-id=082 bgcolor=#d6d6d6
| 577082 ||  || — || April 19, 2004 || Kitt Peak || Spacewatch ||  || align=right | 2.7 km || 
|-id=083 bgcolor=#fefefe
| 577083 ||  || — || August 26, 2005 || Palomar || NEAT ||  || align=right data-sort-value="0.66" | 660 m || 
|-id=084 bgcolor=#d6d6d6
| 577084 ||  || — || January 3, 2013 || Mount Lemmon || Mount Lemmon Survey ||  || align=right | 3.2 km || 
|-id=085 bgcolor=#fefefe
| 577085 ||  || — || December 1, 2005 || Kitt Peak || L. H. Wasserman, R. Millis ||  || align=right data-sort-value="0.57" | 570 m || 
|-id=086 bgcolor=#d6d6d6
| 577086 ||  || — || November 20, 2001 || Socorro || LINEAR ||  || align=right | 2.8 km || 
|-id=087 bgcolor=#d6d6d6
| 577087 ||  || — || October 10, 1996 || Kitt Peak || Spacewatch ||  || align=right | 2.1 km || 
|-id=088 bgcolor=#d6d6d6
| 577088 ||  || — || January 5, 2013 || Mount Lemmon || Mount Lemmon Survey ||  || align=right | 2.4 km || 
|-id=089 bgcolor=#d6d6d6
| 577089 ||  || — || February 10, 2008 || Kitt Peak || Spacewatch ||  || align=right | 2.8 km || 
|-id=090 bgcolor=#d6d6d6
| 577090 ||  || — || January 5, 2002 || Anderson Mesa || LONEOS ||  || align=right | 3.1 km || 
|-id=091 bgcolor=#fefefe
| 577091 ||  || — || April 20, 2010 || Mount Lemmon || Mount Lemmon Survey ||  || align=right data-sort-value="0.67" | 670 m || 
|-id=092 bgcolor=#d6d6d6
| 577092 ||  || — || November 23, 2012 || Kitt Peak || Spacewatch ||  || align=right | 3.7 km || 
|-id=093 bgcolor=#d6d6d6
| 577093 ||  || — || January 5, 2013 || Catalina || CSS || Tj (2.88) || align=right | 4.6 km || 
|-id=094 bgcolor=#d6d6d6
| 577094 ||  || — || December 23, 2012 || Haleakala || Pan-STARRS ||  || align=right | 2.3 km || 
|-id=095 bgcolor=#d6d6d6
| 577095 ||  || — || January 3, 2013 || Haleakala || Pan-STARRS || Tj (2.99) || align=right | 2.8 km || 
|-id=096 bgcolor=#d6d6d6
| 577096 ||  || — || February 6, 2002 || Anderson Mesa || LONEOS ||  || align=right | 4.0 km || 
|-id=097 bgcolor=#fefefe
| 577097 ||  || — || January 5, 2013 || Mount Lemmon || Mount Lemmon Survey ||  || align=right data-sort-value="0.51" | 510 m || 
|-id=098 bgcolor=#d6d6d6
| 577098 ||  || — || January 5, 2003 || Kitt Peak || Spacewatch ||  || align=right | 2.5 km || 
|-id=099 bgcolor=#d6d6d6
| 577099 ||  || — || January 12, 2013 || Mount Lemmon || Mount Lemmon Survey ||  || align=right | 2.6 km || 
|-id=100 bgcolor=#d6d6d6
| 577100 ||  || — || September 3, 2010 || Mount Lemmon || Mount Lemmon Survey ||  || align=right | 2.7 km || 
|}

577101–577200 

|-bgcolor=#d6d6d6
| 577101 ||  || — || December 14, 2012 || ESA OGS || ESA OGS ||  || align=right | 2.5 km || 
|-id=102 bgcolor=#fefefe
| 577102 ||  || — || December 23, 2012 || Haleakala || Pan-STARRS ||  || align=right data-sort-value="0.65" | 650 m || 
|-id=103 bgcolor=#d6d6d6
| 577103 ||  || — || December 17, 2012 || ESA OGS || ESA OGS ||  || align=right | 1.9 km || 
|-id=104 bgcolor=#d6d6d6
| 577104 ||  || — || December 23, 2012 || Haleakala || Pan-STARRS ||  || align=right | 2.7 km || 
|-id=105 bgcolor=#fefefe
| 577105 ||  || — || January 13, 2013 || Mount Lemmon || Mount Lemmon Survey ||  || align=right data-sort-value="0.72" | 720 m || 
|-id=106 bgcolor=#d6d6d6
| 577106 ||  || — || February 3, 2002 || Palomar || NEAT ||  || align=right | 2.9 km || 
|-id=107 bgcolor=#d6d6d6
| 577107 ||  || — || December 23, 2012 || Haleakala || Pan-STARRS ||  || align=right | 2.7 km || 
|-id=108 bgcolor=#d6d6d6
| 577108 ||  || — || December 23, 2006 || Bergisch Gladbach || W. Bickel ||  || align=right | 3.9 km || 
|-id=109 bgcolor=#d6d6d6
| 577109 ||  || — || December 23, 2012 || Haleakala || Pan-STARRS ||  || align=right | 2.9 km || 
|-id=110 bgcolor=#d6d6d6
| 577110 ||  || — || November 18, 2007 || Mount Lemmon || Mount Lemmon Survey ||  || align=right | 2.7 km || 
|-id=111 bgcolor=#d6d6d6
| 577111 ||  || — || December 22, 2012 || Calar Alto-CASADO || S. Mottola ||  || align=right | 2.9 km || 
|-id=112 bgcolor=#d6d6d6
| 577112 ||  || — || May 15, 2005 || Mount Lemmon || Mount Lemmon Survey ||  || align=right | 3.5 km || 
|-id=113 bgcolor=#d6d6d6
| 577113 ||  || — || September 7, 2011 || Kitt Peak || Spacewatch ||  || align=right | 2.4 km || 
|-id=114 bgcolor=#d6d6d6
| 577114 ||  || — || January 10, 2013 || Haleakala || Pan-STARRS ||  || align=right | 2.3 km || 
|-id=115 bgcolor=#d6d6d6
| 577115 ||  || — || January 10, 2013 || Haleakala || Pan-STARRS ||  || align=right | 2.0 km || 
|-id=116 bgcolor=#fefefe
| 577116 ||  || — || July 29, 2008 || Kitt Peak || Spacewatch ||  || align=right data-sort-value="0.52" | 520 m || 
|-id=117 bgcolor=#E9E9E9
| 577117 ||  || — || October 23, 2003 || Kitt Peak || Spacewatch ||  || align=right | 1.0 km || 
|-id=118 bgcolor=#d6d6d6
| 577118 ||  || — || January 12, 2013 || Bergisch Gladbach || W. Bickel ||  || align=right | 2.3 km || 
|-id=119 bgcolor=#d6d6d6
| 577119 ||  || — || September 27, 2012 || Haleakala || Pan-STARRS ||  || align=right | 2.8 km || 
|-id=120 bgcolor=#d6d6d6
| 577120 ||  || — || September 23, 2011 || Kitt Peak || Spacewatch ||  || align=right | 2.7 km || 
|-id=121 bgcolor=#fefefe
| 577121 ||  || — || January 13, 2013 || Mount Lemmon || Mount Lemmon Survey ||  || align=right data-sort-value="0.70" | 700 m || 
|-id=122 bgcolor=#d6d6d6
| 577122 ||  || — || July 31, 2005 || Palomar || NEAT ||  || align=right | 3.1 km || 
|-id=123 bgcolor=#d6d6d6
| 577123 ||  || — || January 13, 2013 || Mount Lemmon || Mount Lemmon Survey ||  || align=right | 2.3 km || 
|-id=124 bgcolor=#d6d6d6
| 577124 ||  || — || January 3, 2013 || Mount Lemmon || Mount Lemmon Survey ||  || align=right | 2.3 km || 
|-id=125 bgcolor=#d6d6d6
| 577125 ||  || — || January 21, 2002 || Kitt Peak || Spacewatch || EOS || align=right | 2.1 km || 
|-id=126 bgcolor=#d6d6d6
| 577126 ||  || — || December 16, 2012 || ESA OGS || ESA OGS ||  || align=right | 2.6 km || 
|-id=127 bgcolor=#fefefe
| 577127 ||  || — || December 21, 2012 || Mount Lemmon || Mount Lemmon Survey ||  || align=right data-sort-value="0.65" | 650 m || 
|-id=128 bgcolor=#d6d6d6
| 577128 ||  || — || December 23, 2012 || Haleakala || Pan-STARRS ||  || align=right | 3.6 km || 
|-id=129 bgcolor=#d6d6d6
| 577129 ||  || — || January 13, 2013 || ESA OGS || ESA OGS ||  || align=right | 2.7 km || 
|-id=130 bgcolor=#d6d6d6
| 577130 ||  || — || January 13, 2013 || ESA OGS || ESA OGS ||  || align=right | 2.2 km || 
|-id=131 bgcolor=#fefefe
| 577131 ||  || — || March 23, 2003 || Drebach || Drebach Obs. ||  || align=right data-sort-value="0.67" | 670 m || 
|-id=132 bgcolor=#d6d6d6
| 577132 ||  || — || December 23, 2012 || Haleakala || Pan-STARRS ||  || align=right | 3.1 km || 
|-id=133 bgcolor=#d6d6d6
| 577133 ||  || — || December 23, 2001 || Kitt Peak || Spacewatch || EOS || align=right | 2.3 km || 
|-id=134 bgcolor=#d6d6d6
| 577134 ||  || — || January 6, 2013 || Kitt Peak || Spacewatch ||  || align=right | 2.9 km || 
|-id=135 bgcolor=#fefefe
| 577135 ||  || — || January 15, 2013 || ESA OGS || ESA OGS ||  || align=right data-sort-value="0.79" | 790 m || 
|-id=136 bgcolor=#d6d6d6
| 577136 ||  || — || January 3, 2013 || Mount Lemmon || Mount Lemmon Survey ||  || align=right | 2.8 km || 
|-id=137 bgcolor=#d6d6d6
| 577137 ||  || — || November 17, 2006 || Mount Lemmon || Mount Lemmon Survey ||  || align=right | 2.9 km || 
|-id=138 bgcolor=#d6d6d6
| 577138 ||  || — || October 23, 2006 || Kitt Peak || Spacewatch ||  || align=right | 2.6 km || 
|-id=139 bgcolor=#C2FFFF
| 577139 ||  || — || June 21, 2007 || Mount Lemmon || Mount Lemmon Survey || L4 || align=right | 10 km || 
|-id=140 bgcolor=#C2FFFF
| 577140 ||  || — || January 5, 2013 || Charleston || R. Holmes || L4 || align=right | 8.8 km || 
|-id=141 bgcolor=#E9E9E9
| 577141 ||  || — || May 4, 2005 || Mount Lemmon || Mount Lemmon Survey ||  || align=right | 2.3 km || 
|-id=142 bgcolor=#E9E9E9
| 577142 ||  || — || January 4, 2013 || Cerro Tololo-DECam || CTIO-DECam ||  || align=right | 1.3 km || 
|-id=143 bgcolor=#d6d6d6
| 577143 ||  || — || January 4, 2013 || Cerro Tololo-DECam || CTIO-DECam ||  || align=right | 2.1 km || 
|-id=144 bgcolor=#d6d6d6
| 577144 ||  || — || August 30, 2005 || Kitt Peak || Spacewatch ||  || align=right | 2.3 km || 
|-id=145 bgcolor=#d6d6d6
| 577145 ||  || — || January 4, 2013 || Cerro Tololo-DECam || CTIO-DECam ||  || align=right | 2.2 km || 
|-id=146 bgcolor=#d6d6d6
| 577146 ||  || — || September 28, 2011 || Kitt Peak || Spacewatch ||  || align=right | 1.9 km || 
|-id=147 bgcolor=#d6d6d6
| 577147 ||  || — || April 1, 2003 || Apache Point || SDSS Collaboration ||  || align=right | 2.2 km || 
|-id=148 bgcolor=#d6d6d6
| 577148 ||  || — || October 24, 2011 || Haleakala || Pan-STARRS ||  || align=right | 2.3 km || 
|-id=149 bgcolor=#d6d6d6
| 577149 ||  || — || January 20, 2013 || Mount Lemmon || Mount Lemmon Survey ||  || align=right | 2.1 km || 
|-id=150 bgcolor=#d6d6d6
| 577150 ||  || — || October 20, 2011 || Kitt Peak || Spacewatch ||  || align=right | 2.5 km || 
|-id=151 bgcolor=#d6d6d6
| 577151 ||  || — || February 10, 2013 || Haleakala || Pan-STARRS ||  || align=right | 1.7 km || 
|-id=152 bgcolor=#d6d6d6
| 577152 ||  || — || February 29, 2008 || Kitt Peak || Spacewatch ||  || align=right | 2.2 km || 
|-id=153 bgcolor=#d6d6d6
| 577153 ||  || — || September 11, 2005 || Kitt Peak || Spacewatch ||  || align=right | 2.5 km || 
|-id=154 bgcolor=#d6d6d6
| 577154 ||  || — || January 21, 2013 || Mount Lemmon || Mount Lemmon Survey ||  || align=right | 2.5 km || 
|-id=155 bgcolor=#d6d6d6
| 577155 ||  || — || October 18, 2011 || Kitt Peak || Spacewatch ||  || align=right | 2.3 km || 
|-id=156 bgcolor=#d6d6d6
| 577156 ||  || — || August 31, 2005 || Kitt Peak || Spacewatch || EOS || align=right | 1.8 km || 
|-id=157 bgcolor=#d6d6d6
| 577157 ||  || — || January 20, 2013 || Mount Lemmon || Mount Lemmon Survey ||  || align=right | 2.2 km || 
|-id=158 bgcolor=#d6d6d6
| 577158 ||  || — || January 4, 2013 || Cerro Tololo-DECam || CTIO-DECam ||  || align=right | 2.5 km || 
|-id=159 bgcolor=#fefefe
| 577159 ||  || — || September 23, 2008 || Kitt Peak || Spacewatch ||  || align=right data-sort-value="0.56" | 560 m || 
|-id=160 bgcolor=#d6d6d6
| 577160 ||  || — || September 29, 2005 || Kitt Peak || Spacewatch ||  || align=right | 2.2 km || 
|-id=161 bgcolor=#d6d6d6
| 577161 ||  || — || January 17, 2013 || Haleakala || Pan-STARRS ||  || align=right | 2.3 km || 
|-id=162 bgcolor=#d6d6d6
| 577162 ||  || — || October 21, 2011 || Kitt Peak || Spacewatch ||  || align=right | 2.3 km || 
|-id=163 bgcolor=#d6d6d6
| 577163 ||  || — || January 4, 2013 || Cerro Tololo-DECam || CTIO-DECam ||  || align=right | 2.0 km || 
|-id=164 bgcolor=#d6d6d6
| 577164 ||  || — || January 4, 2013 || Cerro Tololo-DECam || CTIO-DECam ||  || align=right | 2.3 km || 
|-id=165 bgcolor=#d6d6d6
| 577165 ||  || — || October 24, 2011 || Haleakala || Pan-STARRS ||  || align=right | 1.9 km || 
|-id=166 bgcolor=#E9E9E9
| 577166 ||  || — || February 1, 2009 || Mount Lemmon || Mount Lemmon Survey ||  || align=right | 1.5 km || 
|-id=167 bgcolor=#d6d6d6
| 577167 ||  || — || January 5, 2013 || Cerro Tololo-DECam || CTIO-DECam ||  || align=right | 2.6 km || 
|-id=168 bgcolor=#E9E9E9
| 577168 ||  || — || January 18, 2013 || Haleakala || Pan-STARRS ||  || align=right | 2.1 km || 
|-id=169 bgcolor=#d6d6d6
| 577169 ||  || — || October 4, 2011 || Piszkesteto || K. Sárneczky ||  || align=right | 3.0 km || 
|-id=170 bgcolor=#d6d6d6
| 577170 ||  || — || October 23, 2006 || Kitt Peak || Spacewatch ||  || align=right | 2.0 km || 
|-id=171 bgcolor=#d6d6d6
| 577171 ||  || — || January 6, 2013 || Kitt Peak || Spacewatch ||  || align=right | 2.0 km || 
|-id=172 bgcolor=#d6d6d6
| 577172 ||  || — || February 24, 2014 || Haleakala || Pan-STARRS ||  || align=right | 2.9 km || 
|-id=173 bgcolor=#d6d6d6
| 577173 ||  || — || February 24, 2014 || Haleakala || Pan-STARRS ||  || align=right | 2.2 km || 
|-id=174 bgcolor=#d6d6d6
| 577174 ||  || — || May 18, 2015 || Mount Lemmon || Mount Lemmon Survey ||  || align=right | 2.2 km || 
|-id=175 bgcolor=#E9E9E9
| 577175 ||  || — || January 7, 2013 || Kitt Peak || Spacewatch ||  || align=right | 1.6 km || 
|-id=176 bgcolor=#d6d6d6
| 577176 ||  || — || January 10, 2013 || Haleakala || Pan-STARRS ||  || align=right | 2.1 km || 
|-id=177 bgcolor=#C2FFFF
| 577177 ||  || — || January 10, 2013 || Haleakala || Pan-STARRS || L4 || align=right | 7.0 km || 
|-id=178 bgcolor=#d6d6d6
| 577178 ||  || — || September 17, 2001 || Anderson Mesa || LONEOS ||  || align=right | 2.4 km || 
|-id=179 bgcolor=#d6d6d6
| 577179 ||  || — || November 16, 2006 || Kitt Peak || Spacewatch ||  || align=right | 2.8 km || 
|-id=180 bgcolor=#d6d6d6
| 577180 ||  || — || February 9, 2008 || Mount Lemmon || Mount Lemmon Survey ||  || align=right | 2.7 km || 
|-id=181 bgcolor=#fefefe
| 577181 ||  || — || January 7, 2013 || Kitt Peak || Spacewatch ||  || align=right data-sort-value="0.77" | 770 m || 
|-id=182 bgcolor=#d6d6d6
| 577182 ||  || — || August 30, 2005 || Kitt Peak || Spacewatch ||  || align=right | 2.8 km || 
|-id=183 bgcolor=#d6d6d6
| 577183 ||  || — || October 22, 2006 || Catalina || CSS ||  || align=right | 2.6 km || 
|-id=184 bgcolor=#d6d6d6
| 577184 ||  || — || January 5, 2013 || Kitt Peak || Spacewatch ||  || align=right | 2.2 km || 
|-id=185 bgcolor=#d6d6d6
| 577185 ||  || — || February 9, 2008 || Mount Lemmon || Mount Lemmon Survey ||  || align=right | 2.7 km || 
|-id=186 bgcolor=#fefefe
| 577186 ||  || — || January 4, 2013 || Mount Lemmon || Mount Lemmon Survey ||  || align=right data-sort-value="0.65" | 650 m || 
|-id=187 bgcolor=#d6d6d6
| 577187 ||  || — || September 26, 2006 || Kitt Peak || Spacewatch ||  || align=right | 2.9 km || 
|-id=188 bgcolor=#C2FFFF
| 577188 ||  || — || July 29, 2008 || Mount Lemmon || Mount Lemmon Survey || L4 || align=right | 7.2 km || 
|-id=189 bgcolor=#C2FFFF
| 577189 ||  || — || July 29, 2008 || Kitt Peak || Spacewatch || L4 || align=right | 6.9 km || 
|-id=190 bgcolor=#d6d6d6
| 577190 ||  || — || March 11, 2008 || Kitt Peak || Spacewatch ||  || align=right | 2.7 km || 
|-id=191 bgcolor=#d6d6d6
| 577191 ||  || — || September 24, 2011 || Haleakala || Pan-STARRS ||  || align=right | 2.4 km || 
|-id=192 bgcolor=#E9E9E9
| 577192 ||  || — || September 18, 2011 || Mount Lemmon || Mount Lemmon Survey ||  || align=right | 1.3 km || 
|-id=193 bgcolor=#d6d6d6
| 577193 ||  || — || February 21, 2002 || Kitt Peak || Spacewatch ||  || align=right | 3.1 km || 
|-id=194 bgcolor=#fefefe
| 577194 ||  || — || March 4, 2003 || St. Veran || J.-C. Le Floch ||  || align=right | 1.0 km || 
|-id=195 bgcolor=#d6d6d6
| 577195 ||  || — || February 13, 2002 || Apache Point || SDSS Collaboration ||  || align=right | 3.1 km || 
|-id=196 bgcolor=#d6d6d6
| 577196 ||  || — || March 23, 2002 || Kitt Peak || Spacewatch ||  || align=right | 3.0 km || 
|-id=197 bgcolor=#fefefe
| 577197 ||  || — || January 16, 2013 || Mount Lemmon || Mount Lemmon Survey ||  || align=right data-sort-value="0.57" | 570 m || 
|-id=198 bgcolor=#d6d6d6
| 577198 ||  || — || December 13, 2006 || Kitt Peak || Spacewatch ||  || align=right | 2.8 km || 
|-id=199 bgcolor=#d6d6d6
| 577199 ||  || — || October 19, 2006 || Catalina || CSS ||  || align=right | 2.5 km || 
|-id=200 bgcolor=#d6d6d6
| 577200 ||  || — || December 12, 2006 || Kitt Peak || Spacewatch ||  || align=right | 2.6 km || 
|}

577201–577300 

|-bgcolor=#d6d6d6
| 577201 ||  || — || February 11, 2008 || Mount Lemmon || Mount Lemmon Survey ||  || align=right | 2.5 km || 
|-id=202 bgcolor=#fefefe
| 577202 ||  || — || January 17, 2013 || Haleakala || Pan-STARRS ||  || align=right data-sort-value="0.57" | 570 m || 
|-id=203 bgcolor=#fefefe
| 577203 ||  || — || December 23, 2012 || Haleakala || Pan-STARRS ||  || align=right data-sort-value="0.54" | 540 m || 
|-id=204 bgcolor=#d6d6d6
| 577204 ||  || — || July 31, 2005 || Palomar || NEAT ||  || align=right | 3.0 km || 
|-id=205 bgcolor=#fefefe
| 577205 ||  || — || January 21, 2002 || Kitt Peak || Spacewatch ||  || align=right data-sort-value="0.51" | 510 m || 
|-id=206 bgcolor=#d6d6d6
| 577206 ||  || — || April 20, 2009 || Kitt Peak || Spacewatch ||  || align=right | 2.8 km || 
|-id=207 bgcolor=#d6d6d6
| 577207 ||  || — || September 24, 2011 || Haleakala || Pan-STARRS ||  || align=right | 2.5 km || 
|-id=208 bgcolor=#fefefe
| 577208 ||  || — || January 16, 2013 || Haleakala || Pan-STARRS ||  || align=right data-sort-value="0.65" | 650 m || 
|-id=209 bgcolor=#d6d6d6
| 577209 ||  || — || May 1, 2003 || Kitt Peak || Spacewatch ||  || align=right | 3.3 km || 
|-id=210 bgcolor=#C2FFFF
| 577210 ||  || — || January 16, 2013 || Haleakala || Pan-STARRS || L4 || align=right | 7.9 km || 
|-id=211 bgcolor=#d6d6d6
| 577211 ||  || — || January 10, 2008 || Mount Lemmon || Mount Lemmon Survey ||  || align=right | 2.6 km || 
|-id=212 bgcolor=#fefefe
| 577212 ||  || — || January 16, 2013 || Haleakala || Pan-STARRS ||  || align=right data-sort-value="0.62" | 620 m || 
|-id=213 bgcolor=#E9E9E9
| 577213 ||  || — || January 16, 2013 || Haleakala || Pan-STARRS ||  || align=right | 1.6 km || 
|-id=214 bgcolor=#d6d6d6
| 577214 ||  || — || February 24, 2008 || Mount Lemmon || Mount Lemmon Survey ||  || align=right | 2.8 km || 
|-id=215 bgcolor=#fefefe
| 577215 ||  || — || May 11, 2010 || Mount Lemmon || Mount Lemmon Survey ||  || align=right data-sort-value="0.54" | 540 m || 
|-id=216 bgcolor=#fefefe
| 577216 ||  || — || December 23, 2012 || Haleakala || Pan-STARRS ||  || align=right data-sort-value="0.55" | 550 m || 
|-id=217 bgcolor=#d6d6d6
| 577217 ||  || — || November 22, 2006 || Kitt Peak || Spacewatch ||  || align=right | 2.5 km || 
|-id=218 bgcolor=#d6d6d6
| 577218 ||  || — || March 10, 2008 || Kitt Peak || Spacewatch ||  || align=right | 3.2 km || 
|-id=219 bgcolor=#d6d6d6
| 577219 ||  || — || November 25, 2006 || Kitt Peak || Spacewatch ||  || align=right | 2.9 km || 
|-id=220 bgcolor=#d6d6d6
| 577220 ||  || — || October 31, 2011 || Mayhill-ISON || L. Elenin ||  || align=right | 2.8 km || 
|-id=221 bgcolor=#d6d6d6
| 577221 ||  || — || December 23, 2012 || Haleakala || Pan-STARRS ||  || align=right | 2.8 km || 
|-id=222 bgcolor=#fefefe
| 577222 ||  || — || August 23, 2001 || Anderson Mesa || LONEOS ||  || align=right data-sort-value="0.85" | 850 m || 
|-id=223 bgcolor=#d6d6d6
| 577223 ||  || — || February 10, 2008 || Mount Lemmon || Mount Lemmon Survey ||  || align=right | 2.4 km || 
|-id=224 bgcolor=#d6d6d6
| 577224 ||  || — || January 9, 2013 || Kitt Peak || Spacewatch ||  || align=right | 2.9 km || 
|-id=225 bgcolor=#d6d6d6
| 577225 ||  || — || February 28, 2008 || Kitt Peak || Spacewatch ||  || align=right | 2.9 km || 
|-id=226 bgcolor=#d6d6d6
| 577226 ||  || — || November 3, 2011 || Kitt Peak || Spacewatch ||  || align=right | 3.0 km || 
|-id=227 bgcolor=#fefefe
| 577227 ||  || — || January 15, 2013 || Catalina || CSS ||  || align=right data-sort-value="0.56" | 560 m || 
|-id=228 bgcolor=#d6d6d6
| 577228 ||  || — || November 20, 2007 || Mount Lemmon || Mount Lemmon Survey ||  || align=right | 3.6 km || 
|-id=229 bgcolor=#fefefe
| 577229 ||  || — || September 29, 2008 || Mount Lemmon || Mount Lemmon Survey ||  || align=right data-sort-value="0.69" | 690 m || 
|-id=230 bgcolor=#d6d6d6
| 577230 ||  || — || January 20, 2013 || Kitt Peak || Spacewatch ||  || align=right | 2.6 km || 
|-id=231 bgcolor=#d6d6d6
| 577231 ||  || — || January 30, 2008 || Mount Lemmon || Mount Lemmon Survey ||  || align=right | 2.8 km || 
|-id=232 bgcolor=#d6d6d6
| 577232 ||  || — || January 22, 2013 || Kitt Peak || Spacewatch ||  || align=right | 3.4 km || 
|-id=233 bgcolor=#E9E9E9
| 577233 ||  || — || June 18, 2010 || Mount Lemmon || Mount Lemmon Survey || EUN || align=right | 1.4 km || 
|-id=234 bgcolor=#C2FFFF
| 577234 ||  || — || December 30, 2000 || Kitt Peak || Spacewatch || L4 || align=right | 7.3 km || 
|-id=235 bgcolor=#d6d6d6
| 577235 ||  || — || January 31, 2013 || Mount Lemmon || Mount Lemmon Survey ||  || align=right | 2.7 km || 
|-id=236 bgcolor=#fefefe
| 577236 ||  || — || April 2, 2006 || Kitt Peak || Spacewatch || MAS || align=right data-sort-value="0.60" | 600 m || 
|-id=237 bgcolor=#d6d6d6
| 577237 ||  || — || April 4, 2014 || Mount Lemmon || Mount Lemmon Survey ||  || align=right | 2.6 km || 
|-id=238 bgcolor=#fefefe
| 577238 ||  || — || January 16, 2013 || Haleakala || Pan-STARRS ||  || align=right data-sort-value="0.57" | 570 m || 
|-id=239 bgcolor=#d6d6d6
| 577239 ||  || — || April 6, 2014 || Mount Lemmon || Mount Lemmon Survey ||  || align=right | 2.5 km || 
|-id=240 bgcolor=#d6d6d6
| 577240 ||  || — || June 24, 2015 || Haleakala || Pan-STARRS || Tj (2.98) || align=right | 2.7 km || 
|-id=241 bgcolor=#E9E9E9
| 577241 ||  || — || October 24, 2011 || Haleakala || Pan-STARRS ||  || align=right | 2.0 km || 
|-id=242 bgcolor=#E9E9E9
| 577242 ||  || — || June 26, 2015 || Haleakala || Pan-STARRS ||  || align=right | 1.8 km || 
|-id=243 bgcolor=#fefefe
| 577243 ||  || — || January 19, 2013 || Kitt Peak || Spacewatch ||  || align=right data-sort-value="0.50" | 500 m || 
|-id=244 bgcolor=#fefefe
| 577244 ||  || — || January 31, 2013 || Kitt Peak || Spacewatch ||  || align=right data-sort-value="0.55" | 550 m || 
|-id=245 bgcolor=#fefefe
| 577245 ||  || — || January 22, 2013 || Mount Lemmon || Mount Lemmon Survey ||  || align=right data-sort-value="0.56" | 560 m || 
|-id=246 bgcolor=#d6d6d6
| 577246 ||  || — || January 20, 2013 || Kitt Peak || Spacewatch ||  || align=right | 2.6 km || 
|-id=247 bgcolor=#d6d6d6
| 577247 ||  || — || January 19, 2013 || Kitt Peak || Spacewatch || 7:4 || align=right | 3.1 km || 
|-id=248 bgcolor=#d6d6d6
| 577248 ||  || — || September 29, 2011 || Charleston || R. Holmes ||  || align=right | 2.4 km || 
|-id=249 bgcolor=#fefefe
| 577249 ||  || — || January 17, 2013 || Haleakala || Pan-STARRS ||  || align=right data-sort-value="0.65" | 650 m || 
|-id=250 bgcolor=#fefefe
| 577250 ||  || — || February 7, 2002 || Palomar || NEAT ||  || align=right | 1.1 km || 
|-id=251 bgcolor=#d6d6d6
| 577251 ||  || — || January 10, 2013 || Haleakala || Pan-STARRS ||  || align=right | 2.3 km || 
|-id=252 bgcolor=#fefefe
| 577252 ||  || — || October 23, 2005 || Palomar || NEAT ||  || align=right data-sort-value="0.55" | 550 m || 
|-id=253 bgcolor=#d6d6d6
| 577253 ||  || — || December 7, 2001 || Palomar || NEAT ||  || align=right | 2.4 km || 
|-id=254 bgcolor=#d6d6d6
| 577254 ||  || — || September 24, 2011 || Haleakala || Pan-STARRS ||  || align=right | 2.1 km || 
|-id=255 bgcolor=#d6d6d6
| 577255 ||  || — || January 3, 2013 || Mount Lemmon || Mount Lemmon Survey ||  || align=right | 3.5 km || 
|-id=256 bgcolor=#fefefe
| 577256 ||  || — || February 2, 2013 || Haleakala || Pan-STARRS ||  || align=right data-sort-value="0.80" | 800 m || 
|-id=257 bgcolor=#fefefe
| 577257 ||  || — || November 1, 2008 || Mount Lemmon || Mount Lemmon Survey || NYS || align=right data-sort-value="0.55" | 550 m || 
|-id=258 bgcolor=#d6d6d6
| 577258 ||  || — || August 25, 2005 || Palomar || NEAT || EOS || align=right | 1.8 km || 
|-id=259 bgcolor=#d6d6d6
| 577259 ||  || — || October 23, 2011 || Mount Lemmon || Mount Lemmon Survey ||  || align=right | 3.1 km || 
|-id=260 bgcolor=#d6d6d6
| 577260 ||  || — || February 3, 2013 || Haleakala || Pan-STARRS ||  || align=right | 2.5 km || 
|-id=261 bgcolor=#d6d6d6
| 577261 ||  || — || August 27, 2005 || Palomar || NEAT ||  || align=right | 2.8 km || 
|-id=262 bgcolor=#d6d6d6
| 577262 ||  || — || August 10, 2010 || Kitt Peak || Spacewatch ||  || align=right | 2.6 km || 
|-id=263 bgcolor=#fefefe
| 577263 ||  || — || February 3, 2013 || Haleakala || Pan-STARRS ||  || align=right data-sort-value="0.51" | 510 m || 
|-id=264 bgcolor=#fefefe
| 577264 ||  || — || February 3, 2013 || Haleakala || Pan-STARRS ||  || align=right data-sort-value="0.58" | 580 m || 
|-id=265 bgcolor=#d6d6d6
| 577265 ||  || — || February 5, 2013 || Mount Lemmon || Mount Lemmon Survey ||  || align=right | 2.7 km || 
|-id=266 bgcolor=#d6d6d6
| 577266 ||  || — || February 5, 2013 || Mount Lemmon || Mount Lemmon Survey || 7:4 || align=right | 3.1 km || 
|-id=267 bgcolor=#d6d6d6
| 577267 ||  || — || January 5, 2013 || Mount Lemmon || Mount Lemmon Survey ||  || align=right | 2.2 km || 
|-id=268 bgcolor=#d6d6d6
| 577268 ||  || — || January 6, 2002 || Kitt Peak || Spacewatch ||  || align=right | 3.2 km || 
|-id=269 bgcolor=#d6d6d6
| 577269 ||  || — || January 10, 2013 || Haleakala || Pan-STARRS ||  || align=right | 2.3 km || 
|-id=270 bgcolor=#fefefe
| 577270 ||  || — || March 16, 2002 || Socorro || LINEAR || MAS || align=right data-sort-value="0.72" | 720 m || 
|-id=271 bgcolor=#d6d6d6
| 577271 ||  || — || November 2, 2011 || Mount Lemmon || Mount Lemmon Survey ||  || align=right | 2.5 km || 
|-id=272 bgcolor=#d6d6d6
| 577272 ||  || — || December 15, 2001 || Apache Point || SDSS Collaboration || EOS || align=right | 1.9 km || 
|-id=273 bgcolor=#d6d6d6
| 577273 ||  || — || February 5, 2013 || Kitt Peak || Spacewatch ||  || align=right | 2.5 km || 
|-id=274 bgcolor=#fefefe
| 577274 ||  || — || January 5, 2013 || Kitt Peak || Spacewatch ||  || align=right data-sort-value="0.64" | 640 m || 
|-id=275 bgcolor=#d6d6d6
| 577275 ||  || — || November 2, 2011 || Mount Lemmon || Mount Lemmon Survey ||  || align=right | 2.1 km || 
|-id=276 bgcolor=#fefefe
| 577276 ||  || — || February 5, 2013 || Mount Lemmon || Mount Lemmon Survey ||  || align=right data-sort-value="0.80" | 800 m || 
|-id=277 bgcolor=#d6d6d6
| 577277 ||  || — || February 16, 2002 || Palomar || NEAT ||  || align=right | 3.4 km || 
|-id=278 bgcolor=#d6d6d6
| 577278 ||  || — || February 8, 2013 || Oukaimeden || C. Rinner ||  || align=right | 2.7 km || 
|-id=279 bgcolor=#E9E9E9
| 577279 ||  || — || January 20, 2013 || Kitt Peak || Spacewatch ||  || align=right | 1.8 km || 
|-id=280 bgcolor=#d6d6d6
| 577280 ||  || — || December 17, 2001 || Socorro || LINEAR ||  || align=right | 2.9 km || 
|-id=281 bgcolor=#d6d6d6
| 577281 ||  || — || January 8, 2013 || Mount Lemmon || Mount Lemmon Survey || Tj (2.99) || align=right | 2.5 km || 
|-id=282 bgcolor=#d6d6d6
| 577282 ||  || — || July 30, 2005 || Palomar || NEAT || EOS || align=right | 2.4 km || 
|-id=283 bgcolor=#fefefe
| 577283 ||  || — || May 26, 2003 || Nogales || P. R. Holvorcem, M. Schwartz || V || align=right data-sort-value="0.62" | 620 m || 
|-id=284 bgcolor=#fefefe
| 577284 ||  || — || February 6, 2013 || Nogales || M. Schwartz, P. R. Holvorcem ||  || align=right data-sort-value="0.89" | 890 m || 
|-id=285 bgcolor=#fefefe
| 577285 ||  || — || October 24, 2005 || Mauna Kea || Mauna Kea Obs. ||  || align=right data-sort-value="0.97" | 970 m || 
|-id=286 bgcolor=#d6d6d6
| 577286 ||  || — || January 10, 2013 || Haleakala || Pan-STARRS ||  || align=right | 3.2 km || 
|-id=287 bgcolor=#d6d6d6
| 577287 ||  || — || January 20, 2013 || Mount Lemmon || Mount Lemmon Survey ||  || align=right | 2.9 km || 
|-id=288 bgcolor=#fefefe
| 577288 ||  || — || October 6, 2008 || Kitt Peak || Spacewatch ||  || align=right data-sort-value="0.71" | 710 m || 
|-id=289 bgcolor=#d6d6d6
| 577289 ||  || — || July 30, 2005 || Palomar || NEAT ||  || align=right | 3.1 km || 
|-id=290 bgcolor=#d6d6d6
| 577290 ||  || — || January 19, 2013 || Catalina || CSS || Tj (2.96) || align=right | 3.0 km || 
|-id=291 bgcolor=#d6d6d6
| 577291 ||  || — || February 8, 2013 || Nogales || M. Schwartz, P. R. Holvorcem ||  || align=right | 3.1 km || 
|-id=292 bgcolor=#d6d6d6
| 577292 ||  || — || October 7, 2005 || Mount Lemmon || Mount Lemmon Survey ||  || align=right | 2.7 km || 
|-id=293 bgcolor=#fefefe
| 577293 ||  || — || December 3, 2008 || Kitt Peak || Spacewatch ||  || align=right data-sort-value="0.63" | 630 m || 
|-id=294 bgcolor=#d6d6d6
| 577294 ||  || — || February 5, 2013 || Kitt Peak || Spacewatch ||  || align=right | 3.1 km || 
|-id=295 bgcolor=#C2FFFF
| 577295 ||  || — || February 10, 2013 || Haleakala || Pan-STARRS || L4 || align=right | 9.5 km || 
|-id=296 bgcolor=#E9E9E9
| 577296 ||  || — || October 20, 2003 || Kitt Peak || Spacewatch ||  || align=right | 1.4 km || 
|-id=297 bgcolor=#fefefe
| 577297 ||  || — || January 18, 2013 || Kitt Peak || Spacewatch ||  || align=right data-sort-value="0.75" | 750 m || 
|-id=298 bgcolor=#d6d6d6
| 577298 ||  || — || February 8, 2013 || Haleakala || Pan-STARRS ||  || align=right | 2.2 km || 
|-id=299 bgcolor=#E9E9E9
| 577299 ||  || — || February 8, 2013 || Haleakala || Pan-STARRS ||  || align=right | 1.6 km || 
|-id=300 bgcolor=#E9E9E9
| 577300 ||  || — || February 8, 2013 || Haleakala || Pan-STARRS ||  || align=right | 1.8 km || 
|}

577301–577400 

|-bgcolor=#d6d6d6
| 577301 ||  || — || February 10, 2007 || Mount Lemmon || Mount Lemmon Survey ||  || align=right | 2.3 km || 
|-id=302 bgcolor=#C2FFFF
| 577302 ||  || — || September 28, 2008 || Mount Lemmon || Mount Lemmon Survey || L4ERY || align=right | 7.2 km || 
|-id=303 bgcolor=#fefefe
| 577303 ||  || — || October 1, 2008 || Kitt Peak || Spacewatch || (2076) || align=right data-sort-value="0.57" | 570 m || 
|-id=304 bgcolor=#d6d6d6
| 577304 ||  || — || August 12, 2010 || Kitt Peak || Spacewatch ||  || align=right | 2.4 km || 
|-id=305 bgcolor=#fefefe
| 577305 ||  || — || September 4, 2011 || Haleakala || Pan-STARRS ||  || align=right data-sort-value="0.65" | 650 m || 
|-id=306 bgcolor=#d6d6d6
| 577306 ||  || — || February 9, 2013 || Haleakala || Pan-STARRS ||  || align=right | 3.1 km || 
|-id=307 bgcolor=#d6d6d6
| 577307 ||  || — || July 12, 2005 || Mount Lemmon || Mount Lemmon Survey ||  || align=right | 2.8 km || 
|-id=308 bgcolor=#d6d6d6
| 577308 ||  || — || September 15, 2010 || Mount Lemmon || Mount Lemmon Survey ||  || align=right | 3.1 km || 
|-id=309 bgcolor=#fefefe
| 577309 ||  || — || January 31, 2006 || Kitt Peak || Spacewatch ||  || align=right data-sort-value="0.56" | 560 m || 
|-id=310 bgcolor=#d6d6d6
| 577310 ||  || — || January 19, 2013 || Kitt Peak || Spacewatch ||  || align=right | 3.1 km || 
|-id=311 bgcolor=#d6d6d6
| 577311 ||  || — || January 28, 2007 || Mount Lemmon || Mount Lemmon Survey ||  || align=right | 2.6 km || 
|-id=312 bgcolor=#d6d6d6
| 577312 ||  || — || January 20, 2013 || Kitt Peak || Spacewatch ||  || align=right | 2.3 km || 
|-id=313 bgcolor=#fefefe
| 577313 ||  || — || February 9, 2013 || Haleakala || Pan-STARRS ||  || align=right data-sort-value="0.54" | 540 m || 
|-id=314 bgcolor=#d6d6d6
| 577314 ||  || — || June 3, 2003 || Kitt Peak || Spacewatch ||  || align=right | 2.8 km || 
|-id=315 bgcolor=#d6d6d6
| 577315 ||  || — || April 4, 2008 || Mount Lemmon || Mount Lemmon Survey ||  || align=right | 2.8 km || 
|-id=316 bgcolor=#fefefe
| 577316 ||  || — || December 3, 2005 || Mauna Kea || Mauna Kea Obs. || NYS || align=right data-sort-value="0.81" | 810 m || 
|-id=317 bgcolor=#d6d6d6
| 577317 ||  || — || September 25, 2011 || Haleakala || Pan-STARRS ||  || align=right | 2.3 km || 
|-id=318 bgcolor=#d6d6d6
| 577318 ||  || — || October 24, 2005 || Palomar || NEAT ||  || align=right | 3.5 km || 
|-id=319 bgcolor=#d6d6d6
| 577319 ||  || — || February 14, 2002 || Kitt Peak || Spacewatch ||  || align=right | 3.0 km || 
|-id=320 bgcolor=#fefefe
| 577320 ||  || — || December 2, 2005 || Mauna Kea || Mauna Kea Obs. ||  || align=right data-sort-value="0.86" | 860 m || 
|-id=321 bgcolor=#d6d6d6
| 577321 ||  || — || February 8, 2002 || Kitt Peak || R. Millis, M. W. Buie ||  || align=right | 2.3 km || 
|-id=322 bgcolor=#d6d6d6
| 577322 ||  || — || February 14, 2013 || Haleakala || Pan-STARRS ||  || align=right | 3.6 km || 
|-id=323 bgcolor=#fefefe
| 577323 ||  || — || January 7, 2009 || Kitt Peak || Spacewatch ||  || align=right data-sort-value="0.94" | 940 m || 
|-id=324 bgcolor=#d6d6d6
| 577324 ||  || — || September 9, 2004 || Kitt Peak || Spacewatch ||  || align=right | 3.0 km || 
|-id=325 bgcolor=#C2FFFF
| 577325 ||  || — || September 19, 2009 || Kitt Peak || Spacewatch || L4 || align=right | 7.0 km || 
|-id=326 bgcolor=#d6d6d6
| 577326 ||  || — || July 22, 2004 || Mauna Kea || Mauna Kea Obs. ||  || align=right | 4.0 km || 
|-id=327 bgcolor=#d6d6d6
| 577327 ||  || — || January 15, 2013 || ESA OGS || ESA OGS || 7:4 || align=right | 3.4 km || 
|-id=328 bgcolor=#d6d6d6
| 577328 ||  || — || February 13, 2013 || Haleakala || Pan-STARRS ||  || align=right | 2.8 km || 
|-id=329 bgcolor=#d6d6d6
| 577329 ||  || — || February 13, 2008 || Kitt Peak || Spacewatch ||  || align=right | 2.5 km || 
|-id=330 bgcolor=#d6d6d6
| 577330 ||  || — || April 9, 2008 || Kitt Peak || Spacewatch ||  || align=right | 2.5 km || 
|-id=331 bgcolor=#d6d6d6
| 577331 ||  || — || October 25, 2011 || Haleakala || Pan-STARRS ||  || align=right | 3.1 km || 
|-id=332 bgcolor=#d6d6d6
| 577332 ||  || — || February 8, 2008 || Kitt Peak || Spacewatch ||  || align=right | 2.0 km || 
|-id=333 bgcolor=#d6d6d6
| 577333 ||  || — || December 26, 2006 || Kitt Peak || Spacewatch ||  || align=right | 2.7 km || 
|-id=334 bgcolor=#d6d6d6
| 577334 ||  || — || February 5, 2013 || Kitt Peak || Spacewatch ||  || align=right | 2.6 km || 
|-id=335 bgcolor=#d6d6d6
| 577335 ||  || — || November 24, 2011 || Mount Lemmon || Mount Lemmon Survey ||  || align=right | 2.7 km || 
|-id=336 bgcolor=#fefefe
| 577336 ||  || — || November 30, 2008 || Kitt Peak || Spacewatch ||  || align=right data-sort-value="0.58" | 580 m || 
|-id=337 bgcolor=#fefefe
| 577337 ||  || — || October 6, 2008 || Mount Lemmon || Mount Lemmon Survey ||  || align=right data-sort-value="0.80" | 800 m || 
|-id=338 bgcolor=#fefefe
| 577338 ||  || — || October 15, 2001 || Palomar || NEAT ||  || align=right data-sort-value="0.86" | 860 m || 
|-id=339 bgcolor=#fefefe
| 577339 ||  || — || February 14, 2013 || Haleakala || Pan-STARRS ||  || align=right data-sort-value="0.60" | 600 m || 
|-id=340 bgcolor=#fefefe
| 577340 ||  || — || February 14, 2013 || Haleakala || Pan-STARRS ||  || align=right data-sort-value="0.50" | 500 m || 
|-id=341 bgcolor=#d6d6d6
| 577341 ||  || — || March 12, 2002 || Palomar || NEAT ||  || align=right | 3.0 km || 
|-id=342 bgcolor=#d6d6d6
| 577342 ||  || — || April 1, 2003 || Apache Point || SDSS Collaboration ||  || align=right | 2.1 km || 
|-id=343 bgcolor=#d6d6d6
| 577343 ||  || — || April 4, 2008 || Mount Lemmon || Mount Lemmon Survey ||  || align=right | 2.1 km || 
|-id=344 bgcolor=#fefefe
| 577344 ||  || — || February 14, 2013 || Haleakala || Pan-STARRS ||  || align=right data-sort-value="0.60" | 600 m || 
|-id=345 bgcolor=#fefefe
| 577345 ||  || — || September 18, 2011 || Mount Lemmon || Mount Lemmon Survey ||  || align=right data-sort-value="0.63" | 630 m || 
|-id=346 bgcolor=#d6d6d6
| 577346 ||  || — || February 14, 2013 || Haleakala || Pan-STARRS ||  || align=right | 2.5 km || 
|-id=347 bgcolor=#fefefe
| 577347 ||  || — || February 14, 2013 || Haleakala || Pan-STARRS ||  || align=right data-sort-value="0.63" | 630 m || 
|-id=348 bgcolor=#d6d6d6
| 577348 ||  || — || October 12, 2005 || Kitt Peak || Spacewatch ||  || align=right | 2.2 km || 
|-id=349 bgcolor=#fefefe
| 577349 ||  || — || February 14, 2013 || Mount Lemmon || Mount Lemmon Survey ||  || align=right data-sort-value="0.58" | 580 m || 
|-id=350 bgcolor=#d6d6d6
| 577350 ||  || — || February 15, 2013 || Haleakala || Pan-STARRS ||  || align=right | 2.5 km || 
|-id=351 bgcolor=#fefefe
| 577351 ||  || — || March 2, 2006 || Kitt Peak || Spacewatch ||  || align=right data-sort-value="0.59" | 590 m || 
|-id=352 bgcolor=#fefefe
| 577352 ||  || — || March 21, 2002 || Kitt Peak || Spacewatch ||  || align=right data-sort-value="0.95" | 950 m || 
|-id=353 bgcolor=#d6d6d6
| 577353 ||  || — || October 25, 2011 || Haleakala || Pan-STARRS ||  || align=right | 3.1 km || 
|-id=354 bgcolor=#fefefe
| 577354 ||  || — || September 23, 2008 || Kitt Peak || Spacewatch ||  || align=right data-sort-value="0.60" | 600 m || 
|-id=355 bgcolor=#d6d6d6
| 577355 ||  || — || January 12, 2007 || 7300 || W. K. Y. Yeung ||  || align=right | 3.4 km || 
|-id=356 bgcolor=#d6d6d6
| 577356 ||  || — || January 20, 2013 || Kitt Peak || Spacewatch ||  || align=right | 2.7 km || 
|-id=357 bgcolor=#d6d6d6
| 577357 ||  || — || September 5, 2010 || La Sagra || OAM Obs. ||  || align=right | 3.3 km || 
|-id=358 bgcolor=#d6d6d6
| 577358 ||  || — || February 7, 2002 || Kitt Peak || Spacewatch ||  || align=right | 3.3 km || 
|-id=359 bgcolor=#d6d6d6
| 577359 ||  || — || June 20, 2010 || Mount Lemmon || Mount Lemmon Survey ||  || align=right | 3.1 km || 
|-id=360 bgcolor=#fefefe
| 577360 ||  || — || October 29, 2008 || Kitt Peak || Spacewatch ||  || align=right data-sort-value="0.77" | 770 m || 
|-id=361 bgcolor=#d6d6d6
| 577361 ||  || — || August 14, 2010 || Kitt Peak || Spacewatch ||  || align=right | 2.9 km || 
|-id=362 bgcolor=#C2FFFF
| 577362 ||  || — || July 15, 2004 || Cerro Tololo || Cerro Tololo Obs. || L4 || align=right | 8.6 km || 
|-id=363 bgcolor=#d6d6d6
| 577363 ||  || — || December 24, 2006 || Kitt Peak || Spacewatch || HYG || align=right | 2.1 km || 
|-id=364 bgcolor=#d6d6d6
| 577364 ||  || — || February 5, 2013 || Mount Lemmon || Mount Lemmon Survey ||  || align=right | 2.5 km || 
|-id=365 bgcolor=#E9E9E9
| 577365 ||  || — || March 2, 2009 || Mount Lemmon || Mount Lemmon Survey ||  || align=right data-sort-value="0.75" | 750 m || 
|-id=366 bgcolor=#fefefe
| 577366 ||  || — || September 11, 2004 || Kitt Peak || Spacewatch ||  || align=right data-sort-value="0.69" | 690 m || 
|-id=367 bgcolor=#fefefe
| 577367 ||  || — || March 4, 2006 || Mount Lemmon || Mount Lemmon Survey ||  || align=right data-sort-value="0.61" | 610 m || 
|-id=368 bgcolor=#fefefe
| 577368 ||  || — || January 26, 2006 || Mount Lemmon || Mount Lemmon Survey ||  || align=right data-sort-value="0.58" | 580 m || 
|-id=369 bgcolor=#d6d6d6
| 577369 ||  || — || January 19, 2013 || Kitt Peak || Spacewatch ||  || align=right | 2.9 km || 
|-id=370 bgcolor=#d6d6d6
| 577370 ||  || — || October 26, 2011 || Haleakala || Pan-STARRS ||  || align=right | 2.5 km || 
|-id=371 bgcolor=#fefefe
| 577371 ||  || — || February 14, 2013 || Kitt Peak || Spacewatch ||  || align=right data-sort-value="0.59" | 590 m || 
|-id=372 bgcolor=#d6d6d6
| 577372 ||  || — || October 23, 2011 || Haleakala || Pan-STARRS ||  || align=right | 2.6 km || 
|-id=373 bgcolor=#d6d6d6
| 577373 ||  || — || November 11, 2006 || Mount Lemmon || Mount Lemmon Survey ||  || align=right | 2.0 km || 
|-id=374 bgcolor=#d6d6d6
| 577374 ||  || — || December 27, 2006 || Mount Lemmon || Mount Lemmon Survey ||  || align=right | 2.9 km || 
|-id=375 bgcolor=#fefefe
| 577375 ||  || — || October 24, 2008 || Mount Lemmon || Mount Lemmon Survey ||  || align=right data-sort-value="0.61" | 610 m || 
|-id=376 bgcolor=#fefefe
| 577376 ||  || — || November 19, 2008 || Kitt Peak || Spacewatch ||  || align=right data-sort-value="0.57" | 570 m || 
|-id=377 bgcolor=#d6d6d6
| 577377 ||  || — || October 25, 2011 || Haleakala || Pan-STARRS ||  || align=right | 2.7 km || 
|-id=378 bgcolor=#d6d6d6
| 577378 ||  || — || February 28, 2008 || Kitt Peak || Spacewatch ||  || align=right | 2.5 km || 
|-id=379 bgcolor=#d6d6d6
| 577379 ||  || — || February 8, 2013 || Haleakala || Pan-STARRS ||  || align=right | 2.4 km || 
|-id=380 bgcolor=#d6d6d6
| 577380 ||  || — || November 28, 2006 || Mount Lemmon || Mount Lemmon Survey ||  || align=right | 3.4 km || 
|-id=381 bgcolor=#d6d6d6
| 577381 ||  || — || February 12, 2002 || Kitt Peak || Spacewatch ||  || align=right | 2.8 km || 
|-id=382 bgcolor=#d6d6d6
| 577382 ||  || — || March 3, 1997 || Kitt Peak || Spacewatch || EOS || align=right | 1.5 km || 
|-id=383 bgcolor=#C2FFFF
| 577383 ||  || — || October 14, 2009 || Mount Lemmon || Mount Lemmon Survey || L4 || align=right | 7.1 km || 
|-id=384 bgcolor=#fefefe
| 577384 ||  || — || February 9, 2013 || Haleakala || Pan-STARRS ||  || align=right data-sort-value="0.71" | 710 m || 
|-id=385 bgcolor=#C2FFFF
| 577385 ||  || — || November 3, 2010 || Kitt Peak || Spacewatch || L4 || align=right | 6.9 km || 
|-id=386 bgcolor=#d6d6d6
| 577386 ||  || — || February 14, 2013 || Kitt Peak || Spacewatch ||  || align=right | 2.9 km || 
|-id=387 bgcolor=#d6d6d6
| 577387 ||  || — || February 14, 2013 || Haleakala || Pan-STARRS ||  || align=right | 3.0 km || 
|-id=388 bgcolor=#d6d6d6
| 577388 ||  || — || March 1, 2008 || Catalina || CSS || Tj (2.97) || align=right | 3.2 km || 
|-id=389 bgcolor=#fefefe
| 577389 ||  || — || February 3, 2013 || Haleakala || Pan-STARRS ||  || align=right data-sort-value="0.65" | 650 m || 
|-id=390 bgcolor=#fefefe
| 577390 ||  || — || February 5, 2013 || Kitt Peak || Spacewatch ||  || align=right data-sort-value="0.59" | 590 m || 
|-id=391 bgcolor=#fefefe
| 577391 ||  || — || February 14, 2013 || Haleakala || Pan-STARRS ||  || align=right data-sort-value="0.61" | 610 m || 
|-id=392 bgcolor=#fefefe
| 577392 ||  || — || February 3, 2013 || Haleakala || Pan-STARRS ||  || align=right data-sort-value="0.53" | 530 m || 
|-id=393 bgcolor=#fefefe
| 577393 ||  || — || February 14, 2013 || Mount Lemmon || Mount Lemmon Survey ||  || align=right data-sort-value="0.60" | 600 m || 
|-id=394 bgcolor=#fefefe
| 577394 ||  || — || September 19, 2008 || Kitt Peak || Spacewatch ||  || align=right data-sort-value="0.53" | 530 m || 
|-id=395 bgcolor=#d6d6d6
| 577395 ||  || — || February 13, 2013 || Haleakala || Pan-STARRS ||  || align=right | 2.7 km || 
|-id=396 bgcolor=#d6d6d6
| 577396 ||  || — || February 8, 2013 || Haleakala || Pan-STARRS ||  || align=right | 2.5 km || 
|-id=397 bgcolor=#fefefe
| 577397 ||  || — || July 4, 2014 || Haleakala || Pan-STARRS ||  || align=right data-sort-value="0.48" | 480 m || 
|-id=398 bgcolor=#d6d6d6
| 577398 ||  || — || February 3, 2013 || Haleakala || Pan-STARRS ||  || align=right | 2.6 km || 
|-id=399 bgcolor=#fefefe
| 577399 ||  || — || February 14, 2013 || Kitt Peak || Spacewatch ||  || align=right data-sort-value="0.68" | 680 m || 
|-id=400 bgcolor=#fefefe
| 577400 ||  || — || February 10, 2013 || Haleakala || Pan-STARRS ||  || align=right | 1.0 km || 
|}

577401–577500 

|-bgcolor=#d6d6d6
| 577401 ||  || — || February 15, 2013 || Haleakala || Pan-STARRS || 7:4 || align=right | 2.5 km || 
|-id=402 bgcolor=#d6d6d6
| 577402 ||  || — || February 8, 2013 || Haleakala || Pan-STARRS ||  || align=right | 2.6 km || 
|-id=403 bgcolor=#d6d6d6
| 577403 ||  || — || February 15, 2013 || Haleakala || Pan-STARRS ||  || align=right | 2.8 km || 
|-id=404 bgcolor=#d6d6d6
| 577404 ||  || — || February 3, 2013 || Haleakala || Pan-STARRS ||  || align=right | 3.2 km || 
|-id=405 bgcolor=#d6d6d6
| 577405 ||  || — || February 3, 2013 || Haleakala || Pan-STARRS ||  || align=right | 1.9 km || 
|-id=406 bgcolor=#d6d6d6
| 577406 ||  || — || February 14, 2013 || Haleakala || Pan-STARRS ||  || align=right | 2.4 km || 
|-id=407 bgcolor=#d6d6d6
| 577407 ||  || — || February 15, 2013 || Haleakala || Pan-STARRS ||  || align=right | 2.5 km || 
|-id=408 bgcolor=#E9E9E9
| 577408 ||  || — || February 15, 2013 || Haleakala || Pan-STARRS ||  || align=right | 1.8 km || 
|-id=409 bgcolor=#d6d6d6
| 577409 ||  || — || November 2, 2011 || Mount Lemmon || Mount Lemmon Survey ||  || align=right | 2.7 km || 
|-id=410 bgcolor=#d6d6d6
| 577410 ||  || — || September 3, 2005 || Palomar || NEAT ||  || align=right | 3.5 km || 
|-id=411 bgcolor=#d6d6d6
| 577411 ||  || — || March 25, 2003 || Palomar || NEAT || EOS || align=right | 2.3 km || 
|-id=412 bgcolor=#d6d6d6
| 577412 ||  || — || February 20, 2002 || Kitt Peak || Spacewatch || VER || align=right | 2.7 km || 
|-id=413 bgcolor=#d6d6d6
| 577413 ||  || — || January 20, 2013 || Kitt Peak || Spacewatch ||  || align=right | 3.0 km || 
|-id=414 bgcolor=#d6d6d6
| 577414 ||  || — || February 17, 2013 || Mount Lemmon || Mount Lemmon Survey ||  || align=right | 2.7 km || 
|-id=415 bgcolor=#d6d6d6
| 577415 ||  || — || October 25, 2011 || Haleakala || Pan-STARRS ||  || align=right | 3.2 km || 
|-id=416 bgcolor=#d6d6d6
| 577416 ||  || — || February 5, 2013 || Kitt Peak || Spacewatch ||  || align=right | 2.6 km || 
|-id=417 bgcolor=#d6d6d6
| 577417 ||  || — || March 6, 2013 || Haleakala || Pan-STARRS ||  || align=right | 2.9 km || 
|-id=418 bgcolor=#d6d6d6
| 577418 ||  || — || February 16, 2013 || Mount Lemmon || Mount Lemmon Survey ||  || align=right | 2.1 km || 
|-id=419 bgcolor=#d6d6d6
| 577419 ||  || — || February 18, 2013 || Kitt Peak || Spacewatch ||  || align=right | 2.5 km || 
|-id=420 bgcolor=#d6d6d6
| 577420 ||  || — || February 16, 2013 || Mount Lemmon || Mount Lemmon Survey ||  || align=right | 2.5 km || 
|-id=421 bgcolor=#d6d6d6
| 577421 ||  || — || February 17, 2013 || Mount Lemmon || Mount Lemmon Survey ||  || align=right | 2.5 km || 
|-id=422 bgcolor=#fefefe
| 577422 ||  || — || April 9, 2006 || Kitt Peak || Spacewatch ||  || align=right data-sort-value="0.58" | 580 m || 
|-id=423 bgcolor=#fefefe
| 577423 ||  || — || March 3, 2013 || Mount Lemmon || Mount Lemmon Survey ||  || align=right data-sort-value="0.82" | 820 m || 
|-id=424 bgcolor=#fefefe
| 577424 ||  || — || January 12, 2002 || Palomar || NEAT || NYS || align=right data-sort-value="0.63" | 630 m || 
|-id=425 bgcolor=#fefefe
| 577425 ||  || — || October 19, 2011 || Mount Lemmon || Mount Lemmon Survey ||  || align=right data-sort-value="0.63" | 630 m || 
|-id=426 bgcolor=#d6d6d6
| 577426 ||  || — || February 17, 2013 || Kitt Peak || Spacewatch ||  || align=right | 2.5 km || 
|-id=427 bgcolor=#fefefe
| 577427 ||  || — || January 2, 2009 || Mount Lemmon || Mount Lemmon Survey ||  || align=right data-sort-value="0.55" | 550 m || 
|-id=428 bgcolor=#d6d6d6
| 577428 ||  || — || February 9, 2002 || Kitt Peak || Spacewatch ||  || align=right | 2.6 km || 
|-id=429 bgcolor=#d6d6d6
| 577429 ||  || — || January 19, 2013 || Kitt Peak || Spacewatch ||  || align=right | 2.8 km || 
|-id=430 bgcolor=#E9E9E9
| 577430 ||  || — || March 3, 2013 || Kitt Peak || Spacewatch ||  || align=right data-sort-value="0.50" | 500 m || 
|-id=431 bgcolor=#FA8072
| 577431 ||  || — || March 6, 2013 || Haleakala || Pan-STARRS || H || align=right data-sort-value="0.50" | 500 m || 
|-id=432 bgcolor=#fefefe
| 577432 ||  || — || February 15, 2013 || Haleakala || Pan-STARRS ||  || align=right data-sort-value="0.75" | 750 m || 
|-id=433 bgcolor=#fefefe
| 577433 ||  || — || March 15, 2002 || Palomar || NEAT ||  || align=right | 1.0 km || 
|-id=434 bgcolor=#fefefe
| 577434 ||  || — || May 2, 2006 || Mount Lemmon || Mount Lemmon Survey ||  || align=right data-sort-value="0.59" | 590 m || 
|-id=435 bgcolor=#fefefe
| 577435 ||  || — || March 7, 2013 || Kitt Peak || Spacewatch ||  || align=right data-sort-value="0.74" | 740 m || 
|-id=436 bgcolor=#fefefe
| 577436 ||  || — || March 7, 2013 || Kitt Peak || Spacewatch ||  || align=right data-sort-value="0.86" | 860 m || 
|-id=437 bgcolor=#d6d6d6
| 577437 ||  || — || February 8, 2007 || Palomar || NEAT ||  || align=right | 3.7 km || 
|-id=438 bgcolor=#fefefe
| 577438 ||  || — || November 17, 2011 || Mount Lemmon || Mount Lemmon Survey ||  || align=right data-sort-value="0.68" | 680 m || 
|-id=439 bgcolor=#FA8072
| 577439 ||  || — || December 2, 2008 || Siding Spring || SSS || PHO || align=right data-sort-value="0.72" | 720 m || 
|-id=440 bgcolor=#fefefe
| 577440 ||  || — || March 6, 2013 || Haleakala || Pan-STARRS ||  || align=right data-sort-value="0.71" | 710 m || 
|-id=441 bgcolor=#fefefe
| 577441 ||  || — || September 4, 2011 || Haleakala || Pan-STARRS ||  || align=right data-sort-value="0.58" | 580 m || 
|-id=442 bgcolor=#d6d6d6
| 577442 ||  || — || September 29, 2010 || Mount Lemmon || Mount Lemmon Survey ||  || align=right | 2.3 km || 
|-id=443 bgcolor=#d6d6d6
| 577443 ||  || — || March 6, 2013 || Haleakala || Pan-STARRS ||  || align=right | 2.1 km || 
|-id=444 bgcolor=#fefefe
| 577444 ||  || — || February 9, 2002 || Kitt Peak || Spacewatch ||  || align=right data-sort-value="0.51" | 510 m || 
|-id=445 bgcolor=#d6d6d6
| 577445 ||  || — || February 18, 2013 || Kitt Peak || Spacewatch ||  || align=right | 2.7 km || 
|-id=446 bgcolor=#fefefe
| 577446 ||  || — || March 8, 2013 || Haleakala || Pan-STARRS ||  || align=right data-sort-value="0.64" | 640 m || 
|-id=447 bgcolor=#d6d6d6
| 577447 ||  || — || March 8, 2013 || Haleakala || Pan-STARRS ||  || align=right | 3.1 km || 
|-id=448 bgcolor=#fefefe
| 577448 ||  || — || February 20, 2002 || Kitt Peak || Spacewatch ||  || align=right data-sort-value="0.65" | 650 m || 
|-id=449 bgcolor=#E9E9E9
| 577449 ||  || — || October 13, 2006 || Kitt Peak || Spacewatch ||  || align=right | 2.0 km || 
|-id=450 bgcolor=#d6d6d6
| 577450 ||  || — || April 1, 2008 || Mount Lemmon || Mount Lemmon Survey ||  || align=right | 2.2 km || 
|-id=451 bgcolor=#d6d6d6
| 577451 ||  || — || February 7, 2013 || Kitt Peak || Spacewatch ||  || align=right | 2.6 km || 
|-id=452 bgcolor=#d6d6d6
| 577452 ||  || — || March 7, 2013 || Mount Lemmon || Mount Lemmon Survey ||  || align=right | 2.7 km || 
|-id=453 bgcolor=#d6d6d6
| 577453 ||  || — || March 7, 2013 || Mount Lemmon || Mount Lemmon Survey ||  || align=right | 2.5 km || 
|-id=454 bgcolor=#fefefe
| 577454 ||  || — || March 7, 2013 || Mount Lemmon || Mount Lemmon Survey ||  || align=right data-sort-value="0.65" | 650 m || 
|-id=455 bgcolor=#d6d6d6
| 577455 ||  || — || February 13, 2002 || Kitt Peak || Spacewatch || EOS || align=right | 1.8 km || 
|-id=456 bgcolor=#fefefe
| 577456 ||  || — || May 10, 2002 || Kitt Peak || Spacewatch ||  || align=right data-sort-value="0.73" | 730 m || 
|-id=457 bgcolor=#d6d6d6
| 577457 ||  || — || April 14, 2008 || Mount Lemmon || Mount Lemmon Survey ||  || align=right | 1.9 km || 
|-id=458 bgcolor=#fefefe
| 577458 ||  || — || October 24, 2011 || Haleakala || Pan-STARRS ||  || align=right data-sort-value="0.70" | 700 m || 
|-id=459 bgcolor=#d6d6d6
| 577459 ||  || — || November 1, 2010 || Mount Lemmon || Mount Lemmon Survey ||  || align=right | 2.9 km || 
|-id=460 bgcolor=#fefefe
| 577460 ||  || — || March 12, 2013 || Elena Remote || A. Oreshko || MAS || align=right data-sort-value="0.63" | 630 m || 
|-id=461 bgcolor=#d6d6d6
| 577461 ||  || — || March 13, 2013 || Mount Lemmon || Mount Lemmon Survey ||  || align=right | 2.5 km || 
|-id=462 bgcolor=#fefefe
| 577462 ||  || — || March 25, 2006 || Palomar || NEAT || ERI || align=right | 1.5 km || 
|-id=463 bgcolor=#d6d6d6
| 577463 ||  || — || March 13, 2013 || Catalina || CSS || Tj (2.99) || align=right | 3.1 km || 
|-id=464 bgcolor=#d6d6d6
| 577464 ||  || — || August 30, 2005 || Palomar || NEAT ||  || align=right | 2.7 km || 
|-id=465 bgcolor=#fefefe
| 577465 ||  || — || March 8, 2013 || Haleakala || Pan-STARRS ||  || align=right data-sort-value="0.63" | 630 m || 
|-id=466 bgcolor=#d6d6d6
| 577466 ||  || — || September 11, 2010 || Kitt Peak || Spacewatch ||  || align=right | 2.6 km || 
|-id=467 bgcolor=#fefefe
| 577467 ||  || — || March 8, 2013 || Haleakala || Pan-STARRS ||  || align=right data-sort-value="0.94" | 940 m || 
|-id=468 bgcolor=#d6d6d6
| 577468 ||  || — || August 31, 2005 || Kitt Peak || Spacewatch ||  || align=right | 2.3 km || 
|-id=469 bgcolor=#d6d6d6
| 577469 ||  || — || March 8, 2013 || Haleakala || Pan-STARRS ||  || align=right | 2.6 km || 
|-id=470 bgcolor=#d6d6d6
| 577470 ||  || — || October 31, 2010 || Mount Lemmon || Mount Lemmon Survey ||  || align=right | 2.6 km || 
|-id=471 bgcolor=#fefefe
| 577471 ||  || — || February 2, 2006 || Kitt Peak || Spacewatch ||  || align=right data-sort-value="0.64" | 640 m || 
|-id=472 bgcolor=#fefefe
| 577472 ||  || — || March 11, 2013 || Kitt Peak || Spacewatch ||  || align=right data-sort-value="0.79" | 790 m || 
|-id=473 bgcolor=#d6d6d6
| 577473 ||  || — || April 5, 2008 || Kitt Peak || Spacewatch ||  || align=right | 2.5 km || 
|-id=474 bgcolor=#d6d6d6
| 577474 ||  || — || February 7, 2013 || Catalina || CSS ||  || align=right | 3.2 km || 
|-id=475 bgcolor=#fefefe
| 577475 ||  || — || December 1, 2008 || Kitt Peak || Spacewatch ||  || align=right data-sort-value="0.56" | 560 m || 
|-id=476 bgcolor=#d6d6d6
| 577476 ||  || — || March 13, 2013 || Kitt Peak || Spacewatch ||  || align=right | 2.6 km || 
|-id=477 bgcolor=#fefefe
| 577477 ||  || — || January 17, 2013 || Mount Lemmon || Mount Lemmon Survey ||  || align=right data-sort-value="0.62" | 620 m || 
|-id=478 bgcolor=#fefefe
| 577478 ||  || — || March 13, 2013 || Kitt Peak || Spacewatch ||  || align=right data-sort-value="0.77" | 770 m || 
|-id=479 bgcolor=#fefefe
| 577479 ||  || — || September 23, 2011 || Mount Lemmon || Mount Lemmon Survey ||  || align=right data-sort-value="0.65" | 650 m || 
|-id=480 bgcolor=#fefefe
| 577480 ||  || — || September 26, 2003 || Palomar || NEAT ||  || align=right | 1.3 km || 
|-id=481 bgcolor=#d6d6d6
| 577481 ||  || — || December 21, 2006 || Kitt Peak || Spacewatch ||  || align=right | 2.6 km || 
|-id=482 bgcolor=#d6d6d6
| 577482 ||  || — || March 14, 2013 || Mount Lemmon || Mount Lemmon Survey ||  || align=right | 2.5 km || 
|-id=483 bgcolor=#d6d6d6
| 577483 ||  || — || September 3, 2010 || Mount Lemmon || Mount Lemmon Survey ||  || align=right | 2.7 km || 
|-id=484 bgcolor=#fefefe
| 577484 ||  || — || May 9, 2002 || Palomar || NEAT || NYS || align=right data-sort-value="0.70" | 700 m || 
|-id=485 bgcolor=#fefefe
| 577485 ||  || — || March 5, 2013 || Nogales || M. Schwartz, P. R. Holvorcem ||  || align=right data-sort-value="0.86" | 860 m || 
|-id=486 bgcolor=#d6d6d6
| 577486 ||  || — || April 24, 2008 || Mount Lemmon || Mount Lemmon Survey ||  || align=right | 2.8 km || 
|-id=487 bgcolor=#fefefe
| 577487 ||  || — || February 22, 2002 || Palomar || NEAT ||  || align=right data-sort-value="0.89" | 890 m || 
|-id=488 bgcolor=#fefefe
| 577488 ||  || — || January 20, 2009 || Mount Lemmon || Mount Lemmon Survey ||  || align=right data-sort-value="0.86" | 860 m || 
|-id=489 bgcolor=#fefefe
| 577489 ||  || — || March 13, 2013 || Mount Lemmon || Mount Lemmon Survey ||  || align=right data-sort-value="0.67" | 670 m || 
|-id=490 bgcolor=#d6d6d6
| 577490 ||  || — || January 10, 2013 || Haleakala || Pan-STARRS ||  || align=right | 2.3 km || 
|-id=491 bgcolor=#d6d6d6
| 577491 ||  || — || March 13, 2013 || Kitt Peak || M. W. Buie ||  || align=right | 2.2 km || 
|-id=492 bgcolor=#fefefe
| 577492 ||  || — || April 10, 2013 || Haleakala || Pan-STARRS ||  || align=right data-sort-value="0.58" | 580 m || 
|-id=493 bgcolor=#fefefe
| 577493 ||  || — || March 15, 2013 || Kitt Peak || Spacewatch ||  || align=right data-sort-value="0.55" | 550 m || 
|-id=494 bgcolor=#d6d6d6
| 577494 ||  || — || March 4, 2013 || Haleakala || Pan-STARRS ||  || align=right | 2.9 km || 
|-id=495 bgcolor=#fefefe
| 577495 ||  || — || June 28, 2014 || Haleakala || Pan-STARRS ||  || align=right data-sort-value="0.72" | 720 m || 
|-id=496 bgcolor=#fefefe
| 577496 ||  || — || September 19, 2014 || Haleakala || Pan-STARRS ||  || align=right data-sort-value="0.67" | 670 m || 
|-id=497 bgcolor=#fefefe
| 577497 ||  || — || March 4, 2013 || Haleakala || Pan-STARRS ||  || align=right data-sort-value="0.63" | 630 m || 
|-id=498 bgcolor=#fefefe
| 577498 ||  || — || March 8, 2013 || Haleakala || Pan-STARRS ||  || align=right data-sort-value="0.59" | 590 m || 
|-id=499 bgcolor=#fefefe
| 577499 ||  || — || January 18, 2009 || Kitt Peak || Spacewatch ||  || align=right data-sort-value="0.62" | 620 m || 
|-id=500 bgcolor=#E9E9E9
| 577500 ||  || — || December 23, 2016 || Haleakala || Pan-STARRS ||  || align=right | 2.1 km || 
|}

577501–577600 

|-bgcolor=#d6d6d6
| 577501 ||  || — || August 10, 2016 || Haleakala || Pan-STARRS ||  || align=right | 3.7 km || 
|-id=502 bgcolor=#fefefe
| 577502 ||  || — || February 1, 2006 || Kitt Peak || Spacewatch ||  || align=right data-sort-value="0.59" | 590 m || 
|-id=503 bgcolor=#d6d6d6
| 577503 ||  || — || June 27, 2015 || Haleakala || Pan-STARRS ||  || align=right | 2.6 km || 
|-id=504 bgcolor=#fefefe
| 577504 ||  || — || March 6, 2013 || Haleakala || Pan-STARRS ||  || align=right data-sort-value="0.67" | 670 m || 
|-id=505 bgcolor=#fefefe
| 577505 ||  || — || March 5, 2013 || Haleakala || Pan-STARRS ||  || align=right data-sort-value="0.62" | 620 m || 
|-id=506 bgcolor=#fefefe
| 577506 ||  || — || March 6, 2013 || Haleakala || Pan-STARRS ||  || align=right data-sort-value="0.65" | 650 m || 
|-id=507 bgcolor=#d6d6d6
| 577507 ||  || — || March 13, 2013 || Mount Lemmon || Mount Lemmon Survey ||  || align=right | 2.3 km || 
|-id=508 bgcolor=#d6d6d6
| 577508 ||  || — || March 14, 2013 || Palomar || PTF ||  || align=right | 3.6 km || 
|-id=509 bgcolor=#d6d6d6
| 577509 ||  || — || January 10, 2007 || Mount Lemmon || Mount Lemmon Survey ||  || align=right | 2.6 km || 
|-id=510 bgcolor=#fefefe
| 577510 ||  || — || June 20, 2006 || Palomar || NEAT ||  || align=right data-sort-value="0.84" | 840 m || 
|-id=511 bgcolor=#d6d6d6
| 577511 ||  || — || October 28, 2005 || Mount Lemmon || Mount Lemmon Survey ||  || align=right | 2.7 km || 
|-id=512 bgcolor=#fefefe
| 577512 ||  || — || March 19, 2013 || Palomar || PTF ||  || align=right data-sort-value="0.89" | 890 m || 
|-id=513 bgcolor=#d6d6d6
| 577513 ||  || — || January 27, 2007 || Mount Lemmon || Mount Lemmon Survey ||  || align=right | 3.3 km || 
|-id=514 bgcolor=#fefefe
| 577514 ||  || — || March 24, 2013 || Mount Lemmon || Mount Lemmon Survey ||  || align=right data-sort-value="0.74" | 740 m || 
|-id=515 bgcolor=#d6d6d6
| 577515 ||  || — || March 10, 2007 || Kitt Peak || Spacewatch ||  || align=right | 3.1 km || 
|-id=516 bgcolor=#fefefe
| 577516 ||  || — || February 1, 2005 || Catalina || CSS ||  || align=right data-sort-value="0.81" | 810 m || 
|-id=517 bgcolor=#fefefe
| 577517 ||  || — || May 10, 2002 || Palomar || NEAT ||  || align=right | 1.3 km || 
|-id=518 bgcolor=#fefefe
| 577518 ||  || — || March 13, 2013 || Kitt Peak || Spacewatch ||  || align=right data-sort-value="0.80" | 800 m || 
|-id=519 bgcolor=#fefefe
| 577519 ||  || — || February 21, 2013 || Haleakala || Pan-STARRS ||  || align=right data-sort-value="0.69" | 690 m || 
|-id=520 bgcolor=#d6d6d6
| 577520 ||  || — || March 19, 2013 || Haleakala || Pan-STARRS ||  || align=right | 2.2 km || 
|-id=521 bgcolor=#fefefe
| 577521 ||  || — || March 3, 2006 || Kitt Peak || Spacewatch ||  || align=right data-sort-value="0.72" | 720 m || 
|-id=522 bgcolor=#d6d6d6
| 577522 ||  || — || March 16, 2013 || Mount Lemmon || Mount Lemmon Survey ||  || align=right | 2.5 km || 
|-id=523 bgcolor=#fefefe
| 577523 ||  || — || March 19, 2013 || Haleakala || Pan-STARRS ||  || align=right data-sort-value="0.58" | 580 m || 
|-id=524 bgcolor=#d6d6d6
| 577524 ||  || — || May 9, 2014 || Haleakala || Pan-STARRS ||  || align=right | 2.6 km || 
|-id=525 bgcolor=#fefefe
| 577525 ||  || — || March 19, 2013 || Haleakala || Pan-STARRS ||  || align=right data-sort-value="0.54" | 540 m || 
|-id=526 bgcolor=#fefefe
| 577526 ||  || — || March 19, 2013 || Haleakala || Pan-STARRS ||  || align=right data-sort-value="0.53" | 530 m || 
|-id=527 bgcolor=#fefefe
| 577527 ||  || — || March 12, 2002 || Palomar || NEAT ||  || align=right data-sort-value="0.89" | 890 m || 
|-id=528 bgcolor=#fefefe
| 577528 ||  || — || September 26, 2011 || Haleakala || Pan-STARRS ||  || align=right data-sort-value="0.58" | 580 m || 
|-id=529 bgcolor=#d6d6d6
| 577529 ||  || — || April 3, 2013 || Palomar || PTF ||  || align=right | 2.5 km || 
|-id=530 bgcolor=#fefefe
| 577530 ||  || — || June 1, 2006 || Wrightwood || J. W. Young || NYS || align=right data-sort-value="0.73" | 730 m || 
|-id=531 bgcolor=#d6d6d6
| 577531 ||  || — || October 13, 2010 || Mount Lemmon || Mount Lemmon Survey ||  || align=right | 2.9 km || 
|-id=532 bgcolor=#fefefe
| 577532 ||  || — || November 3, 2004 || Kitt Peak || Spacewatch ||  || align=right data-sort-value="0.83" | 830 m || 
|-id=533 bgcolor=#d6d6d6
| 577533 ||  || — || April 1, 2013 || Mount Lemmon || Mount Lemmon Survey ||  || align=right | 2.8 km || 
|-id=534 bgcolor=#d6d6d6
| 577534 ||  || — || March 28, 2008 || Mount Lemmon || Mount Lemmon Survey ||  || align=right | 1.8 km || 
|-id=535 bgcolor=#d6d6d6
| 577535 ||  || — || October 27, 2005 || Uccle || E. W. Elst, H. Debehogne ||  || align=right | 3.1 km || 
|-id=536 bgcolor=#fefefe
| 577536 ||  || — || February 1, 2009 || Kitt Peak || Spacewatch || MAS || align=right data-sort-value="0.66" | 660 m || 
|-id=537 bgcolor=#fefefe
| 577537 ||  || — || April 19, 2006 || Mount Lemmon || Mount Lemmon Survey ||  || align=right data-sort-value="0.85" | 850 m || 
|-id=538 bgcolor=#d6d6d6
| 577538 ||  || — || March 18, 2013 || Kitt Peak || Spacewatch || 7:4 || align=right | 2.9 km || 
|-id=539 bgcolor=#d6d6d6
| 577539 ||  || — || March 16, 2013 || Mount Lemmon || Mount Lemmon Survey ||  || align=right | 2.3 km || 
|-id=540 bgcolor=#fefefe
| 577540 ||  || — || March 16, 2013 || Kitt Peak || Spacewatch ||  || align=right data-sort-value="0.67" | 670 m || 
|-id=541 bgcolor=#fefefe
| 577541 ||  || — || May 6, 2006 || Mount Lemmon || Mount Lemmon Survey ||  || align=right data-sort-value="0.81" | 810 m || 
|-id=542 bgcolor=#fefefe
| 577542 ||  || — || November 15, 2011 || Mount Lemmon || Mount Lemmon Survey ||  || align=right data-sort-value="0.63" | 630 m || 
|-id=543 bgcolor=#d6d6d6
| 577543 ||  || — || August 29, 2009 || Kitt Peak || Spacewatch ||  || align=right | 2.7 km || 
|-id=544 bgcolor=#fefefe
| 577544 ||  || — || October 24, 2011 || Mount Lemmon || Mount Lemmon Survey ||  || align=right data-sort-value="0.58" | 580 m || 
|-id=545 bgcolor=#d6d6d6
| 577545 ||  || — || March 13, 2013 || Kitt Peak || Spacewatch ||  || align=right | 2.8 km || 
|-id=546 bgcolor=#d6d6d6
| 577546 ||  || — || November 24, 2011 || Haleakala || Pan-STARRS ||  || align=right | 3.4 km || 
|-id=547 bgcolor=#fefefe
| 577547 ||  || — || May 4, 2002 || Kitt Peak || Spacewatch || MAS || align=right data-sort-value="0.63" | 630 m || 
|-id=548 bgcolor=#fefefe
| 577548 ||  || — || March 17, 2013 || Mount Lemmon || Mount Lemmon Survey ||  || align=right data-sort-value="0.54" | 540 m || 
|-id=549 bgcolor=#d6d6d6
| 577549 ||  || — || February 23, 2007 || Kitt Peak || Spacewatch ||  || align=right | 2.4 km || 
|-id=550 bgcolor=#d6d6d6
| 577550 ||  || — || June 30, 2008 || Kitt Peak || Spacewatch ||  || align=right | 1.9 km || 
|-id=551 bgcolor=#fefefe
| 577551 ||  || — || May 4, 2006 || Mount Lemmon || Mount Lemmon Survey ||  || align=right data-sort-value="0.64" | 640 m || 
|-id=552 bgcolor=#fefefe
| 577552 ||  || — || February 3, 2009 || Mount Lemmon || Mount Lemmon Survey ||  || align=right data-sort-value="0.73" | 730 m || 
|-id=553 bgcolor=#fefefe
| 577553 ||  || — || March 13, 2013 || Palomar || PTF ||  || align=right data-sort-value="0.96" | 960 m || 
|-id=554 bgcolor=#fefefe
| 577554 ||  || — || September 30, 2003 || Kitt Peak || Spacewatch ||  || align=right data-sort-value="0.86" | 860 m || 
|-id=555 bgcolor=#d6d6d6
| 577555 ||  || — || November 8, 2010 || Mount Lemmon || Mount Lemmon Survey ||  || align=right | 2.7 km || 
|-id=556 bgcolor=#fefefe
| 577556 ||  || — || October 22, 2003 || Kitt Peak || Spacewatch ||  || align=right data-sort-value="0.83" | 830 m || 
|-id=557 bgcolor=#fefefe
| 577557 ||  || — || December 11, 2004 || Klet || Kleť Obs. ||  || align=right | 1.1 km || 
|-id=558 bgcolor=#d6d6d6
| 577558 ||  || — || August 23, 2003 || Palomar || NEAT ||  || align=right | 3.3 km || 
|-id=559 bgcolor=#fefefe
| 577559 ||  || — || March 11, 2013 || Mount Lemmon || Mount Lemmon Survey ||  || align=right data-sort-value="0.87" | 870 m || 
|-id=560 bgcolor=#fefefe
| 577560 ||  || — || August 20, 2006 || Palomar || NEAT ||  || align=right | 1.2 km || 
|-id=561 bgcolor=#d6d6d6
| 577561 ||  || — || September 17, 2010 || Mount Lemmon || Mount Lemmon Survey ||  || align=right | 2.7 km || 
|-id=562 bgcolor=#fefefe
| 577562 ||  || — || March 12, 2013 || Mount Lemmon || Mount Lemmon Survey ||  || align=right data-sort-value="0.71" | 710 m || 
|-id=563 bgcolor=#fefefe
| 577563 ||  || — || April 9, 2013 || Haleakala || Pan-STARRS ||  || align=right data-sort-value="0.70" | 700 m || 
|-id=564 bgcolor=#fefefe
| 577564 ||  || — || March 1, 2009 || Mount Lemmon || Mount Lemmon Survey ||  || align=right data-sort-value="0.80" | 800 m || 
|-id=565 bgcolor=#fefefe
| 577565 ||  || — || December 14, 2004 || Campo Imperatore || CINEOS ||  || align=right data-sort-value="0.90" | 900 m || 
|-id=566 bgcolor=#fefefe
| 577566 ||  || — || January 8, 1994 || Kitt Peak || Spacewatch || NYS || align=right data-sort-value="0.54" | 540 m || 
|-id=567 bgcolor=#fefefe
| 577567 ||  || — || April 2, 2002 || Kitt Peak || Spacewatch ||  || align=right data-sort-value="0.95" | 950 m || 
|-id=568 bgcolor=#fefefe
| 577568 ||  || — || February 2, 2009 || Mount Lemmon || Mount Lemmon Survey ||  || align=right data-sort-value="0.86" | 860 m || 
|-id=569 bgcolor=#fefefe
| 577569 ||  || — || June 20, 2002 || La Palma || La Palma Obs. ||  || align=right data-sort-value="0.87" | 870 m || 
|-id=570 bgcolor=#fefefe
| 577570 ||  || — || April 4, 2002 || Palomar || NEAT ||  || align=right data-sort-value="0.79" | 790 m || 
|-id=571 bgcolor=#fefefe
| 577571 ||  || — || March 22, 2009 || Mount Lemmon || Mount Lemmon Survey ||  || align=right data-sort-value="0.68" | 680 m || 
|-id=572 bgcolor=#fefefe
| 577572 ||  || — || February 1, 2009 || Kitt Peak || Spacewatch ||  || align=right data-sort-value="0.83" | 830 m || 
|-id=573 bgcolor=#d6d6d6
| 577573 ||  || — || October 31, 2010 || Mount Lemmon || Mount Lemmon Survey ||  || align=right | 3.2 km || 
|-id=574 bgcolor=#d6d6d6
| 577574 ||  || — || February 7, 2002 || Palomar || NEAT ||  || align=right | 2.5 km || 
|-id=575 bgcolor=#fefefe
| 577575 ||  || — || April 7, 2013 || Mount Lemmon || Mount Lemmon Survey ||  || align=right data-sort-value="0.83" | 830 m || 
|-id=576 bgcolor=#fefefe
| 577576 ||  || — || May 25, 2006 || Kitt Peak || Spacewatch ||  || align=right data-sort-value="0.85" | 850 m || 
|-id=577 bgcolor=#fefefe
| 577577 ||  || — || September 29, 2003 || Kitt Peak || Spacewatch || V || align=right data-sort-value="0.65" | 650 m || 
|-id=578 bgcolor=#C2E0FF
| 577578 ||  || — || March 7, 2013 || Mauna Kea || Mauna Kea Obs. || twotinocritical || align=right | 134 km || 
|-id=579 bgcolor=#fefefe
| 577579 ||  || — || February 19, 2009 || Kitt Peak || Spacewatch ||  || align=right data-sort-value="0.71" | 710 m || 
|-id=580 bgcolor=#fefefe
| 577580 ||  || — || April 11, 2013 || Mount Lemmon || Mount Lemmon Survey ||  || align=right data-sort-value="0.81" | 810 m || 
|-id=581 bgcolor=#fefefe
| 577581 ||  || — || March 3, 2009 || Kitt Peak || Spacewatch ||  || align=right data-sort-value="0.70" | 700 m || 
|-id=582 bgcolor=#fefefe
| 577582 ||  || — || March 1, 2009 || Kitt Peak || Spacewatch ||  || align=right data-sort-value="0.64" | 640 m || 
|-id=583 bgcolor=#fefefe
| 577583 ||  || — || April 15, 2013 || Haleakala || Pan-STARRS ||  || align=right data-sort-value="0.72" | 720 m || 
|-id=584 bgcolor=#E9E9E9
| 577584 ||  || — || September 30, 2006 || Mount Lemmon || Mount Lemmon Survey ||  || align=right | 1.8 km || 
|-id=585 bgcolor=#fefefe
| 577585 ||  || — || April 13, 2013 || Haleakala || Pan-STARRS ||  || align=right data-sort-value="0.58" | 580 m || 
|-id=586 bgcolor=#d6d6d6
| 577586 ||  || — || April 12, 2013 || Haleakala || Pan-STARRS ||  || align=right | 2.5 km || 
|-id=587 bgcolor=#fefefe
| 577587 ||  || — || April 15, 2013 || Haleakala || Pan-STARRS ||  || align=right data-sort-value="0.80" | 800 m || 
|-id=588 bgcolor=#d6d6d6
| 577588 ||  || — || April 10, 2013 || Haleakala || Pan-STARRS ||  || align=right | 2.3 km || 
|-id=589 bgcolor=#d6d6d6
| 577589 ||  || — || April 9, 2013 || Haleakala || Pan-STARRS ||  || align=right | 2.4 km || 
|-id=590 bgcolor=#fefefe
| 577590 ||  || — || April 4, 2013 || Haleakala || Pan-STARRS ||  || align=right data-sort-value="0.79" | 790 m || 
|-id=591 bgcolor=#d6d6d6
| 577591 ||  || — || November 10, 2010 || Kitt Peak || Spacewatch ||  || align=right | 3.7 km || 
|-id=592 bgcolor=#FA8072
| 577592 ||  || — || April 17, 2013 || Haleakala || Pan-STARRS || H || align=right data-sort-value="0.49" | 490 m || 
|-id=593 bgcolor=#fefefe
| 577593 ||  || — || April 13, 2002 || Palomar || NEAT ||  || align=right | 1.2 km || 
|-id=594 bgcolor=#fefefe
| 577594 ||  || — || November 20, 2003 || Kitt Peak || Spacewatch || NYS || align=right data-sort-value="0.75" | 750 m || 
|-id=595 bgcolor=#d6d6d6
| 577595 ||  || — || April 12, 2013 || Haleakala || Pan-STARRS ||  || align=right | 2.4 km || 
|-id=596 bgcolor=#fefefe
| 577596 ||  || — || February 3, 2009 || Kitt Peak || Spacewatch ||  || align=right data-sort-value="0.62" | 620 m || 
|-id=597 bgcolor=#d6d6d6
| 577597 ||  || — || October 29, 2010 || Kitt Peak || Spacewatch ||  || align=right | 2.9 km || 
|-id=598 bgcolor=#fefefe
| 577598 ||  || — || April 16, 2013 || Cerro Tololo-DECam || CTIO-DECam ||  || align=right data-sort-value="0.82" | 820 m || 
|-id=599 bgcolor=#fefefe
| 577599 ||  || — || January 3, 2009 || Mount Lemmon || Mount Lemmon Survey ||  || align=right data-sort-value="0.55" | 550 m || 
|-id=600 bgcolor=#d6d6d6
| 577600 ||  || — || May 14, 2008 || Mount Lemmon || Mount Lemmon Survey ||  || align=right | 2.0 km || 
|}

577601–577700 

|-bgcolor=#d6d6d6
| 577601 ||  || — || October 17, 2003 || Apache Point || SDSS Collaboration ||  || align=right | 2.2 km || 
|-id=602 bgcolor=#fefefe
| 577602 ||  || — || January 20, 2009 || Kitt Peak || Spacewatch ||  || align=right data-sort-value="0.63" | 630 m || 
|-id=603 bgcolor=#fefefe
| 577603 ||  || — || February 20, 2009 || Mount Lemmon || Mount Lemmon Survey ||  || align=right data-sort-value="0.68" | 680 m || 
|-id=604 bgcolor=#fefefe
| 577604 ||  || — || December 19, 2001 || Palomar || NEAT ||  || align=right data-sort-value="0.77" | 770 m || 
|-id=605 bgcolor=#d6d6d6
| 577605 ||  || — || April 16, 2013 || Cerro Tololo-DECam || CTIO-DECam ||  || align=right | 3.0 km || 
|-id=606 bgcolor=#fefefe
| 577606 ||  || — || October 12, 2004 || Moletai || K. Černis, J. Zdanavičius ||  || align=right data-sort-value="0.76" | 760 m || 
|-id=607 bgcolor=#fefefe
| 577607 ||  || — || November 10, 2004 || Kitt Peak || Spacewatch ||  || align=right data-sort-value="0.63" | 630 m || 
|-id=608 bgcolor=#fefefe
| 577608 ||  || — || September 18, 2003 || Palomar || NEAT ||  || align=right data-sort-value="0.87" | 870 m || 
|-id=609 bgcolor=#d6d6d6
| 577609 ||  || — || April 9, 2013 || Haleakala || Pan-STARRS ||  || align=right | 2.4 km || 
|-id=610 bgcolor=#fefefe
| 577610 ||  || — || September 9, 2007 || Kitt Peak || Spacewatch ||  || align=right data-sort-value="0.72" | 720 m || 
|-id=611 bgcolor=#fefefe
| 577611 ||  || — || November 30, 2003 || Kitt Peak || Spacewatch ||  || align=right data-sort-value="0.67" | 670 m || 
|-id=612 bgcolor=#d6d6d6
| 577612 ||  || — || May 1, 2013 || Mount Lemmon || Mount Lemmon Survey ||  || align=right | 2.3 km || 
|-id=613 bgcolor=#fefefe
| 577613 ||  || — || April 30, 2013 || Mount Lemmon || Mount Lemmon Survey ||  || align=right data-sort-value="0.54" | 540 m || 
|-id=614 bgcolor=#d6d6d6
| 577614 ||  || — || October 11, 2004 || Kitt Peak || L. H. Wasserman, J. R. Lovering ||  || align=right | 2.2 km || 
|-id=615 bgcolor=#d6d6d6
| 577615 ||  || — || April 9, 2013 || Haleakala || Pan-STARRS ||  || align=right | 2.2 km || 
|-id=616 bgcolor=#fefefe
| 577616 ||  || — || April 9, 2013 || Haleakala || Pan-STARRS ||  || align=right data-sort-value="0.56" | 560 m || 
|-id=617 bgcolor=#d6d6d6
| 577617 ||  || — || September 17, 2009 || Catalina || CSS || Tj (2.98) || align=right | 3.1 km || 
|-id=618 bgcolor=#d6d6d6
| 577618 ||  || — || April 9, 2013 || Haleakala || Pan-STARRS ||  || align=right | 2.4 km || 
|-id=619 bgcolor=#fefefe
| 577619 ||  || — || April 16, 2013 || Cerro Tololo-DECam || CTIO-DECam ||  || align=right data-sort-value="0.63" | 630 m || 
|-id=620 bgcolor=#fefefe
| 577620 ||  || — || April 10, 2013 || Haleakala || Pan-STARRS ||  || align=right data-sort-value="0.55" | 550 m || 
|-id=621 bgcolor=#fefefe
| 577621 ||  || — || April 16, 2013 || Cerro Tololo-DECam || CTIO-DECam ||  || align=right data-sort-value="0.60" | 600 m || 
|-id=622 bgcolor=#fefefe
| 577622 ||  || — || September 29, 2011 || Piszkesteto || K. Sárneczky ||  || align=right data-sort-value="0.62" | 620 m || 
|-id=623 bgcolor=#fefefe
| 577623 ||  || — || October 22, 2003 || Kitt Peak || Spacewatch ||  || align=right data-sort-value="0.55" | 550 m || 
|-id=624 bgcolor=#d6d6d6
| 577624 ||  || — || September 18, 2010 || Mount Lemmon || Mount Lemmon Survey ||  || align=right | 2.8 km || 
|-id=625 bgcolor=#d6d6d6
| 577625 ||  || — || April 16, 2013 || Cerro Tololo-DECam || CTIO-DECam ||  || align=right | 2.3 km || 
|-id=626 bgcolor=#d6d6d6
| 577626 ||  || — || April 9, 2013 || Haleakala || Pan-STARRS ||  || align=right | 2.1 km || 
|-id=627 bgcolor=#C2E0FF
| 577627 ||  || — || April 17, 2013 || Haleakala || Pan-STARRS || other TNOcritical || align=right | 160 km || 
|-id=628 bgcolor=#d6d6d6
| 577628 ||  || — || March 16, 2007 || Kitt Peak || Spacewatch ||  || align=right | 2.5 km || 
|-id=629 bgcolor=#d6d6d6
| 577629 ||  || — || April 19, 2013 || Haleakala || Pan-STARRS ||  || align=right | 2.7 km || 
|-id=630 bgcolor=#d6d6d6
| 577630 ||  || — || October 1, 2015 || Mount Lemmon || Mount Lemmon Survey ||  || align=right | 2.6 km || 
|-id=631 bgcolor=#d6d6d6
| 577631 ||  || — || April 19, 2013 || Haleakala || Pan-STARRS ||  || align=right | 2.8 km || 
|-id=632 bgcolor=#d6d6d6
| 577632 ||  || — || January 1, 2012 || Mount Lemmon || Mount Lemmon Survey ||  || align=right | 2.5 km || 
|-id=633 bgcolor=#E9E9E9
| 577633 ||  || — || April 16, 2013 || Haleakala || Pan-STARRS ||  || align=right data-sort-value="0.75" | 750 m || 
|-id=634 bgcolor=#fefefe
| 577634 ||  || — || February 20, 2009 || Mount Lemmon || Mount Lemmon Survey ||  || align=right data-sort-value="0.60" | 600 m || 
|-id=635 bgcolor=#fefefe
| 577635 ||  || — || September 18, 2010 || Mount Lemmon || Mount Lemmon Survey ||  || align=right data-sort-value="0.75" | 750 m || 
|-id=636 bgcolor=#fefefe
| 577636 ||  || — || October 15, 2003 || Palomar || NEAT ||  || align=right data-sort-value="0.88" | 880 m || 
|-id=637 bgcolor=#fefefe
| 577637 ||  || — || February 20, 2009 || Kitt Peak || Spacewatch || NYS || align=right data-sort-value="0.65" | 650 m || 
|-id=638 bgcolor=#d6d6d6
| 577638 ||  || — || September 19, 2009 || Mount Lemmon || Mount Lemmon Survey ||  || align=right | 3.2 km || 
|-id=639 bgcolor=#fefefe
| 577639 ||  || — || May 9, 2013 || Mount Lemmon || Mount Lemmon Survey || H || align=right data-sort-value="0.54" | 540 m || 
|-id=640 bgcolor=#fefefe
| 577640 ||  || — || April 5, 2013 || Palomar || PTF || H || align=right data-sort-value="0.59" | 590 m || 
|-id=641 bgcolor=#fefefe
| 577641 ||  || — || October 24, 2011 || Haleakala || Pan-STARRS ||  || align=right data-sort-value="0.81" | 810 m || 
|-id=642 bgcolor=#d6d6d6
| 577642 ||  || — || May 9, 2013 || Calar Alto || F. Hormuth || 7:4 || align=right | 2.8 km || 
|-id=643 bgcolor=#d6d6d6
| 577643 ||  || — || March 11, 2007 || Kitt Peak || Spacewatch ||  || align=right | 2.6 km || 
|-id=644 bgcolor=#d6d6d6
| 577644 ||  || — || April 18, 2013 || Mount Lemmon || Mount Lemmon Survey || Tj (2.92) || align=right | 3.2 km || 
|-id=645 bgcolor=#fefefe
| 577645 ||  || — || February 20, 2009 || Kitt Peak || Spacewatch ||  || align=right data-sort-value="0.71" | 710 m || 
|-id=646 bgcolor=#d6d6d6
| 577646 ||  || — || October 23, 2011 || Haleakala || Pan-STARRS ||  || align=right | 2.2 km || 
|-id=647 bgcolor=#d6d6d6
| 577647 ||  || — || September 10, 2004 || Kitt Peak || Spacewatch ||  || align=right | 3.4 km || 
|-id=648 bgcolor=#d6d6d6
| 577648 ||  || — || September 12, 2002 || Palomar || NEAT || 7:4 || align=right | 4.0 km || 
|-id=649 bgcolor=#d6d6d6
| 577649 ||  || — || April 10, 2013 || Haleakala || Pan-STARRS ||  || align=right | 2.2 km || 
|-id=650 bgcolor=#fefefe
| 577650 ||  || — || February 28, 2009 || Kitt Peak || Spacewatch ||  || align=right data-sort-value="0.72" | 720 m || 
|-id=651 bgcolor=#fefefe
| 577651 ||  || — || September 11, 2010 || Kitt Peak || Spacewatch ||  || align=right data-sort-value="0.65" | 650 m || 
|-id=652 bgcolor=#fefefe
| 577652 ||  || — || February 19, 2009 || Kitt Peak || Spacewatch ||  || align=right data-sort-value="0.64" | 640 m || 
|-id=653 bgcolor=#fefefe
| 577653 ||  || — || April 18, 2013 || Mount Lemmon || Mount Lemmon Survey ||  || align=right | 1.0 km || 
|-id=654 bgcolor=#fefefe
| 577654 ||  || — || October 29, 2011 || Kitt Peak || Spacewatch ||  || align=right | 1.4 km || 
|-id=655 bgcolor=#fefefe
| 577655 ||  || — || May 15, 2013 || Haleakala || Pan-STARRS ||  || align=right data-sort-value="0.82" | 820 m || 
|-id=656 bgcolor=#fefefe
| 577656 ||  || — || May 8, 2013 || Haleakala || Pan-STARRS ||  || align=right data-sort-value="0.65" | 650 m || 
|-id=657 bgcolor=#fefefe
| 577657 ||  || — || May 2, 2013 || Kitt Peak || Spacewatch ||  || align=right data-sort-value="0.66" | 660 m || 
|-id=658 bgcolor=#fefefe
| 577658 ||  || — || October 3, 2003 || Kitt Peak || Spacewatch || H || align=right data-sort-value="0.65" | 650 m || 
|-id=659 bgcolor=#E9E9E9
| 577659 ||  || — || December 28, 2011 || Mount Lemmon || Mount Lemmon Survey ||  || align=right data-sort-value="0.89" | 890 m || 
|-id=660 bgcolor=#d6d6d6
| 577660 ||  || — || September 18, 2010 || Mount Lemmon || Mount Lemmon Survey ||  || align=right | 3.2 km || 
|-id=661 bgcolor=#fefefe
| 577661 ||  || — || April 4, 2002 || Kitt Peak || Spacewatch || MAS || align=right data-sort-value="0.76" | 760 m || 
|-id=662 bgcolor=#d6d6d6
| 577662 ||  || — || October 14, 2010 || Mount Lemmon || Mount Lemmon Survey ||  || align=right | 3.3 km || 
|-id=663 bgcolor=#d6d6d6
| 577663 ||  || — || May 16, 2013 || Haleakala || Pan-STARRS ||  || align=right | 3.5 km || 
|-id=664 bgcolor=#fefefe
| 577664 ||  || — || March 21, 2009 || Mount Lemmon || Mount Lemmon Survey ||  || align=right data-sort-value="0.58" | 580 m || 
|-id=665 bgcolor=#d6d6d6
| 577665 ||  || — || September 25, 2008 || Mount Lemmon || Mount Lemmon Survey ||  || align=right | 3.1 km || 
|-id=666 bgcolor=#fefefe
| 577666 ||  || — || October 20, 2003 || Palomar || NEAT ||  || align=right data-sort-value="0.73" | 730 m || 
|-id=667 bgcolor=#fefefe
| 577667 ||  || — || August 29, 2006 || Catalina || CSS || V || align=right data-sort-value="0.83" | 830 m || 
|-id=668 bgcolor=#fefefe
| 577668 ||  || — || May 17, 2013 || Mount Lemmon || Mount Lemmon Survey ||  || align=right data-sort-value="0.52" | 520 m || 
|-id=669 bgcolor=#fefefe
| 577669 ||  || — || February 1, 2005 || Kitt Peak || Spacewatch ||  || align=right data-sort-value="0.80" | 800 m || 
|-id=670 bgcolor=#d6d6d6
| 577670 ||  || — || June 4, 2013 || Mount Lemmon || Mount Lemmon Survey ||  || align=right | 2.5 km || 
|-id=671 bgcolor=#fefefe
| 577671 ||  || — || October 1, 2010 || Mount Lemmon || Mount Lemmon Survey ||  || align=right data-sort-value="0.62" | 620 m || 
|-id=672 bgcolor=#d6d6d6
| 577672 ||  || — || June 1, 2013 || Mount Lemmon || Mount Lemmon Survey ||  || align=right | 3.2 km || 
|-id=673 bgcolor=#fefefe
| 577673 ||  || — || June 1, 2013 || Haleakala || Pan-STARRS ||  || align=right data-sort-value="0.58" | 580 m || 
|-id=674 bgcolor=#fefefe
| 577674 ||  || — || April 3, 2005 || Palomar || NEAT ||  || align=right | 1.1 km || 
|-id=675 bgcolor=#FA8072
| 577675 ||  || — || January 28, 2004 || Kitt Peak || Spacewatch || H || align=right data-sort-value="0.67" | 670 m || 
|-id=676 bgcolor=#fefefe
| 577676 ||  || — || June 18, 2013 || Haleakala || Pan-STARRS || H || align=right data-sort-value="0.70" | 700 m || 
|-id=677 bgcolor=#fefefe
| 577677 ||  || — || January 17, 2007 || Palomar || NEAT || H || align=right data-sort-value="0.56" | 560 m || 
|-id=678 bgcolor=#fefefe
| 577678 ||  || — || June 17, 2013 || Haleakala || Pan-STARRS ||  || align=right data-sort-value="0.80" | 800 m || 
|-id=679 bgcolor=#E9E9E9
| 577679 ||  || — || January 3, 2011 || Mount Lemmon || Mount Lemmon Survey ||  || align=right | 1.5 km || 
|-id=680 bgcolor=#E9E9E9
| 577680 ||  || — || June 30, 2013 || Haleakala || Pan-STARRS ||  || align=right | 1.2 km || 
|-id=681 bgcolor=#E9E9E9
| 577681 ||  || — || November 29, 2014 || Mount Lemmon || Mount Lemmon Survey ||  || align=right | 1.1 km || 
|-id=682 bgcolor=#fefefe
| 577682 ||  || — || June 20, 2013 || Haleakala || Pan-STARRS ||  || align=right data-sort-value="0.79" | 790 m || 
|-id=683 bgcolor=#fefefe
| 577683 ||  || — || June 18, 2013 || Haleakala || Pan-STARRS ||  || align=right data-sort-value="0.86" | 860 m || 
|-id=684 bgcolor=#E9E9E9
| 577684 ||  || — || June 18, 2013 || Haleakala || Pan-STARRS ||  || align=right | 1.1 km || 
|-id=685 bgcolor=#fefefe
| 577685 ||  || — || June 18, 2013 || Haleakala || Pan-STARRS ||  || align=right data-sort-value="0.58" | 580 m || 
|-id=686 bgcolor=#d6d6d6
| 577686 ||  || — || July 1, 2013 || Haleakala || Pan-STARRS ||  || align=right | 3.1 km || 
|-id=687 bgcolor=#fefefe
| 577687 ||  || — || July 3, 2013 || Haleakala || Pan-STARRS || H || align=right data-sort-value="0.58" | 580 m || 
|-id=688 bgcolor=#E9E9E9
| 577688 ||  || — || July 6, 2013 || Haleakala || Pan-STARRS ||  || align=right data-sort-value="0.80" | 800 m || 
|-id=689 bgcolor=#fefefe
| 577689 ||  || — || June 2, 2013 || Elena Remote || A. Oreshko ||  || align=right data-sort-value="0.81" | 810 m || 
|-id=690 bgcolor=#E9E9E9
| 577690 ||  || — || July 29, 2005 || Palomar || NEAT ||  || align=right | 1.4 km || 
|-id=691 bgcolor=#fefefe
| 577691 ||  || — || May 29, 2009 || Kitt Peak || Spacewatch ||  || align=right data-sort-value="0.60" | 600 m || 
|-id=692 bgcolor=#fefefe
| 577692 ||  || — || June 18, 2013 || Haleakala || Pan-STARRS || H || align=right data-sort-value="0.44" | 440 m || 
|-id=693 bgcolor=#E9E9E9
| 577693 ||  || — || July 13, 2013 || Haleakala || Pan-STARRS ||  || align=right | 1.3 km || 
|-id=694 bgcolor=#E9E9E9
| 577694 ||  || — || June 20, 2013 || Haleakala || Pan-STARRS ||  || align=right data-sort-value="0.94" | 940 m || 
|-id=695 bgcolor=#E9E9E9
| 577695 ||  || — || June 19, 2013 || Mount Lemmon || Mount Lemmon Survey ||  || align=right | 1.3 km || 
|-id=696 bgcolor=#fefefe
| 577696 ||  || — || July 15, 2013 || Haleakala || Pan-STARRS ||  || align=right data-sort-value="0.58" | 580 m || 
|-id=697 bgcolor=#E9E9E9
| 577697 ||  || — || January 4, 2011 || Mount Lemmon || Mount Lemmon Survey ||  || align=right data-sort-value="0.81" | 810 m || 
|-id=698 bgcolor=#E9E9E9
| 577698 ||  || — || March 29, 2008 || Vail-Jarnac || Jarnac Obs. ||  || align=right | 1.4 km || 
|-id=699 bgcolor=#E9E9E9
| 577699 ||  || — || May 5, 2008 || Mount Lemmon || Mount Lemmon Survey ||  || align=right | 1.2 km || 
|-id=700 bgcolor=#E9E9E9
| 577700 ||  || — || July 2, 2005 || Kitt Peak || Spacewatch ||  || align=right | 1.3 km || 
|}

577701–577800 

|-bgcolor=#E9E9E9
| 577701 ||  || — || July 13, 2013 || Haleakala || Pan-STARRS ||  || align=right | 1.3 km || 
|-id=702 bgcolor=#fefefe
| 577702 ||  || — || July 15, 2013 || Haleakala || Pan-STARRS ||  || align=right data-sort-value="0.72" | 720 m || 
|-id=703 bgcolor=#E9E9E9
| 577703 ||  || — || July 12, 2013 || Haleakala || Pan-STARRS ||  || align=right | 1.3 km || 
|-id=704 bgcolor=#fefefe
| 577704 ||  || — || July 15, 2013 || Haleakala || Pan-STARRS ||  || align=right data-sort-value="0.75" | 750 m || 
|-id=705 bgcolor=#E9E9E9
| 577705 ||  || — || July 15, 2013 || Haleakala || Pan-STARRS ||  || align=right data-sort-value="0.92" | 920 m || 
|-id=706 bgcolor=#E9E9E9
| 577706 ||  || — || July 12, 2013 || Haleakala || Pan-STARRS ||  || align=right data-sort-value="0.98" | 980 m || 
|-id=707 bgcolor=#E9E9E9
| 577707 ||  || — || July 15, 2013 || Haleakala || Pan-STARRS ||  || align=right | 1.5 km || 
|-id=708 bgcolor=#E9E9E9
| 577708 ||  || — || July 15, 2013 || Haleakala || Pan-STARRS ||  || align=right | 1.2 km || 
|-id=709 bgcolor=#fefefe
| 577709 ||  || — || June 21, 2013 || Mount Lemmon || Mount Lemmon Survey || H || align=right data-sort-value="0.51" | 510 m || 
|-id=710 bgcolor=#fefefe
| 577710 ||  || — || July 19, 2013 || Haleakala || Pan-STARRS || H || align=right data-sort-value="0.74" | 740 m || 
|-id=711 bgcolor=#fefefe
| 577711 ||  || — || May 31, 2009 || Cerro Burek || Alianza S4 Obs. ||  || align=right | 1.0 km || 
|-id=712 bgcolor=#fefefe
| 577712 ||  || — || July 2, 2013 || Haleakala || Pan-STARRS ||  || align=right data-sort-value="0.85" | 850 m || 
|-id=713 bgcolor=#E9E9E9
| 577713 ||  || — || July 30, 2005 || Palomar || NEAT ||  || align=right | 1.4 km || 
|-id=714 bgcolor=#C2FFFF
| 577714 ||  || — || January 7, 2016 || Haleakala || Pan-STARRS || L5 || align=right | 5.9 km || 
|-id=715 bgcolor=#E9E9E9
| 577715 ||  || — || July 18, 2013 || Haleakala || Pan-STARRS ||  || align=right | 2.0 km || 
|-id=716 bgcolor=#fefefe
| 577716 ||  || — || September 20, 2014 || Haleakala || Pan-STARRS ||  || align=right data-sort-value="0.73" | 730 m || 
|-id=717 bgcolor=#fefefe
| 577717 ||  || — || February 20, 2015 || Haleakala || Pan-STARRS || H || align=right data-sort-value="0.46" | 460 m || 
|-id=718 bgcolor=#E9E9E9
| 577718 ||  || — || June 2, 2008 || Mount Lemmon || Mount Lemmon Survey ||  || align=right | 1.9 km || 
|-id=719 bgcolor=#E9E9E9
| 577719 ||  || — || November 17, 2014 || Haleakala || Pan-STARRS ||  || align=right | 1.2 km || 
|-id=720 bgcolor=#E9E9E9
| 577720 ||  || — || August 29, 2005 || Palomar || NEAT ||  || align=right | 1.1 km || 
|-id=721 bgcolor=#E9E9E9
| 577721 ||  || — || October 25, 2001 || Apache Point || SDSS Collaboration ||  || align=right data-sort-value="0.75" | 750 m || 
|-id=722 bgcolor=#E9E9E9
| 577722 ||  || — || August 16, 2009 || Kitt Peak || Spacewatch ||  || align=right data-sort-value="0.77" | 770 m || 
|-id=723 bgcolor=#FFC2E0
| 577723 ||  || — || August 2, 2013 || Haleakala || Pan-STARRS || APO || align=right data-sort-value="0.32" | 320 m || 
|-id=724 bgcolor=#d6d6d6
| 577724 ||  || — || July 9, 2013 || Haleakala || Pan-STARRS || 3:2 || align=right | 4.1 km || 
|-id=725 bgcolor=#fefefe
| 577725 ||  || — || June 17, 2013 || Mount Lemmon || Mount Lemmon Survey ||  || align=right | 1.2 km || 
|-id=726 bgcolor=#E9E9E9
| 577726 ||  || — || May 14, 2004 || Catalina || CSS ||  || align=right | 1.8 km || 
|-id=727 bgcolor=#fefefe
| 577727 ||  || — || September 3, 2002 || Palomar || NEAT || H || align=right data-sort-value="0.50" | 500 m || 
|-id=728 bgcolor=#fefefe
| 577728 ||  || — || October 17, 2010 || Mount Lemmon || Mount Lemmon Survey ||  || align=right data-sort-value="0.59" | 590 m || 
|-id=729 bgcolor=#fefefe
| 577729 ||  || — || September 15, 2010 || Les Engarouines || L. Bernasconi ||  || align=right data-sort-value="0.70" | 700 m || 
|-id=730 bgcolor=#E9E9E9
| 577730 ||  || — || October 17, 2009 || Bisei SG Center || K. Nishiyama, T. Sakamoto || WIT || align=right | 1.2 km || 
|-id=731 bgcolor=#E9E9E9
| 577731 ||  || — || October 23, 2009 || Mount Lemmon || Mount Lemmon Survey ||  || align=right | 1.2 km || 
|-id=732 bgcolor=#E9E9E9
| 577732 ||  || — || July 30, 2005 || Palomar || NEAT ||  || align=right data-sort-value="0.87" | 870 m || 
|-id=733 bgcolor=#fefefe
| 577733 ||  || — || August 2, 2013 || Haleakala || Pan-STARRS || H || align=right data-sort-value="0.62" | 620 m || 
|-id=734 bgcolor=#E9E9E9
| 577734 ||  || — || September 3, 2000 || Kitt Peak || Spacewatch ||  || align=right | 1.6 km || 
|-id=735 bgcolor=#E9E9E9
| 577735 ||  || — || April 16, 2008 || Mount Lemmon || Mount Lemmon Survey ||  || align=right data-sort-value="0.77" | 770 m || 
|-id=736 bgcolor=#FA8072
| 577736 ||  || — || August 12, 2013 || Palomar || PTF ||  || align=right | 1.2 km || 
|-id=737 bgcolor=#E9E9E9
| 577737 ||  || — || February 7, 2003 || Palomar || NEAT ||  || align=right | 1.1 km || 
|-id=738 bgcolor=#E9E9E9
| 577738 ||  || — || July 31, 2005 || Palomar || NEAT ||  || align=right data-sort-value="0.89" | 890 m || 
|-id=739 bgcolor=#fefefe
| 577739 ||  || — || June 10, 2013 || Mount Lemmon || Mount Lemmon Survey ||  || align=right | 1.0 km || 
|-id=740 bgcolor=#E9E9E9
| 577740 ||  || — || August 31, 2005 || Kitt Peak || Spacewatch ||  || align=right | 1.4 km || 
|-id=741 bgcolor=#fefefe
| 577741 ||  || — || June 20, 2013 || Haleakala || Pan-STARRS || H || align=right data-sort-value="0.54" | 540 m || 
|-id=742 bgcolor=#fefefe
| 577742 ||  || — || August 9, 2013 || Kitt Peak || Spacewatch ||  || align=right data-sort-value="0.59" | 590 m || 
|-id=743 bgcolor=#E9E9E9
| 577743 ||  || — || November 13, 2005 || Palomar || NEAT ||  || align=right data-sort-value="0.92" | 920 m || 
|-id=744 bgcolor=#fefefe
| 577744 ||  || — || August 11, 2013 || Palomar || PTF || H || align=right data-sort-value="0.68" | 680 m || 
|-id=745 bgcolor=#fefefe
| 577745 ||  || — || August 12, 2013 || Kitt Peak || Spacewatch || H || align=right data-sort-value="0.54" | 540 m || 
|-id=746 bgcolor=#fefefe
| 577746 ||  || — || August 12, 2013 || Haleakala || Pan-STARRS || H || align=right data-sort-value="0.46" | 460 m || 
|-id=747 bgcolor=#fefefe
| 577747 ||  || — || August 13, 2013 || Haleakala || Pan-STARRS || H || align=right data-sort-value="0.51" | 510 m || 
|-id=748 bgcolor=#E9E9E9
| 577748 ||  || — || August 14, 2013 || Haleakala || Pan-STARRS ||  || align=right data-sort-value="0.98" | 980 m || 
|-id=749 bgcolor=#E9E9E9
| 577749 ||  || — || August 18, 2009 || Kitt Peak || Spacewatch ||  || align=right data-sort-value="0.76" | 760 m || 
|-id=750 bgcolor=#E9E9E9
| 577750 ||  || — || August 8, 2013 || Kitt Peak || Spacewatch ||  || align=right data-sort-value="0.77" | 770 m || 
|-id=751 bgcolor=#E9E9E9
| 577751 ||  || — || August 9, 2013 || Haleakala || Pan-STARRS ||  || align=right | 1.9 km || 
|-id=752 bgcolor=#E9E9E9
| 577752 ||  || — || September 13, 2005 || Kitt Peak || Spacewatch ||  || align=right data-sort-value="0.70" | 700 m || 
|-id=753 bgcolor=#E9E9E9
| 577753 ||  || — || August 15, 2013 || Haleakala || Pan-STARRS ||  || align=right data-sort-value="0.85" | 850 m || 
|-id=754 bgcolor=#fefefe
| 577754 ||  || — || August 6, 2013 || Piszkesteto || K. Sárneczky ||  || align=right data-sort-value="0.67" | 670 m || 
|-id=755 bgcolor=#fefefe
| 577755 ||  || — || September 12, 1994 || Kitt Peak || Spacewatch ||  || align=right data-sort-value="0.69" | 690 m || 
|-id=756 bgcolor=#E9E9E9
| 577756 ||  || — || August 14, 2013 || Haleakala || Pan-STARRS ||  || align=right data-sort-value="0.79" | 790 m || 
|-id=757 bgcolor=#E9E9E9
| 577757 ||  || — || August 10, 2013 || Kitt Peak || Spacewatch ||  || align=right data-sort-value="0.78" | 780 m || 
|-id=758 bgcolor=#fefefe
| 577758 ||  || — || August 15, 2013 || Haleakala || Pan-STARRS ||  || align=right data-sort-value="0.53" | 530 m || 
|-id=759 bgcolor=#E9E9E9
| 577759 ||  || — || August 9, 2013 || Haleakala || Pan-STARRS ||  || align=right | 1.5 km || 
|-id=760 bgcolor=#fefefe
| 577760 ||  || — || August 12, 2013 || Haleakala || Pan-STARRS ||  || align=right data-sort-value="0.59" | 590 m || 
|-id=761 bgcolor=#E9E9E9
| 577761 ||  || — || August 12, 2013 || Haleakala || Pan-STARRS ||  || align=right data-sort-value="0.74" | 740 m || 
|-id=762 bgcolor=#E9E9E9
| 577762 ||  || — || August 12, 2013 || Haleakala || Pan-STARRS ||  || align=right data-sort-value="0.93" | 930 m || 
|-id=763 bgcolor=#E9E9E9
| 577763 ||  || — || August 14, 2013 || Haleakala || Pan-STARRS ||  || align=right | 1.8 km || 
|-id=764 bgcolor=#d6d6d6
| 577764 ||  || — || August 15, 2013 || Haleakala || Pan-STARRS ||  || align=right | 2.2 km || 
|-id=765 bgcolor=#E9E9E9
| 577765 ||  || — || August 16, 2013 || Palomar || PTF ||  || align=right | 1.1 km || 
|-id=766 bgcolor=#E9E9E9
| 577766 ||  || — || August 25, 2005 || Palomar || NEAT ||  || align=right data-sort-value="0.53" | 530 m || 
|-id=767 bgcolor=#E9E9E9
| 577767 ||  || — || January 5, 2011 || Mount Lemmon || Mount Lemmon Survey || MAR || align=right | 1.0 km || 
|-id=768 bgcolor=#fefefe
| 577768 ||  || — || October 23, 2003 || Apache Point || SDSS Collaboration || H || align=right data-sort-value="0.60" | 600 m || 
|-id=769 bgcolor=#E9E9E9
| 577769 ||  || — || August 27, 2013 || Haleakala || Pan-STARRS ||  || align=right data-sort-value="0.71" | 710 m || 
|-id=770 bgcolor=#E9E9E9
| 577770 ||  || — || August 31, 2013 || Elena Remote || A. Oreshko ||  || align=right | 1.0 km || 
|-id=771 bgcolor=#d6d6d6
| 577771 ||  || — || October 2, 2006 || Mount Lemmon || Mount Lemmon Survey || 3:2 || align=right | 3.6 km || 
|-id=772 bgcolor=#fefefe
| 577772 ||  || — || September 30, 2006 || Mount Lemmon || Mount Lemmon Survey ||  || align=right data-sort-value="0.66" | 660 m || 
|-id=773 bgcolor=#E9E9E9
| 577773 ||  || — || January 10, 2007 || Kitt Peak || Spacewatch ||  || align=right data-sort-value="0.92" | 920 m || 
|-id=774 bgcolor=#E9E9E9
| 577774 ||  || — || August 26, 2005 || Palomar || NEAT ||  || align=right | 1.4 km || 
|-id=775 bgcolor=#E9E9E9
| 577775 ||  || — || August 26, 2013 || Haleakala || Pan-STARRS ||  || align=right | 1.0 km || 
|-id=776 bgcolor=#E9E9E9
| 577776 ||  || — || August 25, 2005 || Palomar || NEAT ||  || align=right | 1.2 km || 
|-id=777 bgcolor=#E9E9E9
| 577777 ||  || — || August 28, 2013 || Palomar || PTF ||  || align=right | 2.9 km || 
|-id=778 bgcolor=#d6d6d6
| 577778 ||  || — || August 4, 2013 || Haleakala || Pan-STARRS || 3:2 || align=right | 4.3 km || 
|-id=779 bgcolor=#E9E9E9
| 577779 ||  || — || February 27, 2012 || Haleakala || Pan-STARRS ||  || align=right data-sort-value="0.73" | 730 m || 
|-id=780 bgcolor=#E9E9E9
| 577780 ||  || — || August 30, 2013 || Haleakala || Pan-STARRS ||  || align=right data-sort-value="0.96" | 960 m || 
|-id=781 bgcolor=#fefefe
| 577781 ||  || — || August 26, 2005 || Palomar || NEAT ||  || align=right | 1.1 km || 
|-id=782 bgcolor=#E9E9E9
| 577782 ||  || — || March 22, 2012 || Mount Lemmon || Mount Lemmon Survey ||  || align=right data-sort-value="0.73" | 730 m || 
|-id=783 bgcolor=#E9E9E9
| 577783 ||  || — || April 15, 2012 || Haleakala || Pan-STARRS ||  || align=right | 1.8 km || 
|-id=784 bgcolor=#E9E9E9
| 577784 ||  || — || August 15, 2013 || Haleakala || Pan-STARRS ||  || align=right data-sort-value="0.68" | 680 m || 
|-id=785 bgcolor=#fefefe
| 577785 ||  || — || January 25, 2012 || Haleakala || Pan-STARRS || H || align=right data-sort-value="0.36" | 360 m || 
|-id=786 bgcolor=#E9E9E9
| 577786 ||  || — || August 15, 2013 || Haleakala || Pan-STARRS ||  || align=right | 1.5 km || 
|-id=787 bgcolor=#E9E9E9
| 577787 ||  || — || August 31, 2013 || Haleakala || Pan-STARRS ||  || align=right | 1.4 km || 
|-id=788 bgcolor=#E9E9E9
| 577788 ||  || — || August 15, 2013 || Haleakala || Pan-STARRS ||  || align=right | 1.2 km || 
|-id=789 bgcolor=#E9E9E9
| 577789 ||  || — || September 14, 2005 || Kitt Peak || Spacewatch ||  || align=right data-sort-value="0.91" | 910 m || 
|-id=790 bgcolor=#E9E9E9
| 577790 ||  || — || August 9, 2013 || Kitt Peak || Spacewatch ||  || align=right data-sort-value="0.75" | 750 m || 
|-id=791 bgcolor=#E9E9E9
| 577791 ||  || — || June 18, 2005 || Mount Lemmon || Mount Lemmon Survey ||  || align=right | 1.1 km || 
|-id=792 bgcolor=#E9E9E9
| 577792 ||  || — || January 31, 2003 || Anderson Mesa || LONEOS ||  || align=right | 1.4 km || 
|-id=793 bgcolor=#E9E9E9
| 577793 ||  || — || September 16, 2009 || Mount Lemmon || Mount Lemmon Survey || MAR || align=right data-sort-value="0.74" | 740 m || 
|-id=794 bgcolor=#E9E9E9
| 577794 ||  || — || August 24, 2005 || Palomar || NEAT ||  || align=right data-sort-value="0.80" | 800 m || 
|-id=795 bgcolor=#E9E9E9
| 577795 ||  || — || July 12, 2005 || Mount Lemmon || Mount Lemmon Survey ||  || align=right data-sort-value="0.82" | 820 m || 
|-id=796 bgcolor=#E9E9E9
| 577796 ||  || — || August 22, 2009 || Dauban || C. Rinner, F. Kugel ||  || align=right data-sort-value="0.52" | 520 m || 
|-id=797 bgcolor=#E9E9E9
| 577797 ||  || — || February 6, 2011 || Kitt Peak || Spacewatch ||  || align=right | 1.5 km || 
|-id=798 bgcolor=#E9E9E9
| 577798 ||  || — || November 25, 2005 || Kitt Peak || Spacewatch ||  || align=right | 1.2 km || 
|-id=799 bgcolor=#E9E9E9
| 577799 ||  || — || August 27, 2013 || Haleakala || Pan-STARRS ||  || align=right data-sort-value="0.88" | 880 m || 
|-id=800 bgcolor=#E9E9E9
| 577800 ||  || — || February 23, 2012 || Kitt Peak || Spacewatch ||  || align=right data-sort-value="0.75" | 750 m || 
|}

577801–577900 

|-bgcolor=#E9E9E9
| 577801 ||  || — || January 4, 2011 || Mount Lemmon || Mount Lemmon Survey ||  || align=right data-sort-value="0.88" | 880 m || 
|-id=802 bgcolor=#E9E9E9
| 577802 ||  || — || September 1, 2005 || Kitt Peak || Spacewatch ||  || align=right data-sort-value="0.79" | 790 m || 
|-id=803 bgcolor=#E9E9E9
| 577803 ||  || — || January 28, 2007 || Kitt Peak || Spacewatch ||  || align=right data-sort-value="0.89" | 890 m || 
|-id=804 bgcolor=#E9E9E9
| 577804 ||  || — || April 19, 2012 || Mount Lemmon || Mount Lemmon Survey ||  || align=right data-sort-value="0.73" | 730 m || 
|-id=805 bgcolor=#d6d6d6
| 577805 ||  || — || May 21, 2012 || Haleakala || Pan-STARRS || 3:2 || align=right | 2.8 km || 
|-id=806 bgcolor=#E9E9E9
| 577806 ||  || — || August 30, 2005 || Kitt Peak || Spacewatch ||  || align=right data-sort-value="0.81" | 810 m || 
|-id=807 bgcolor=#E9E9E9
| 577807 ||  || — || September 1, 2009 || Bergisch Gladbach || W. Bickel || MAR || align=right data-sort-value="0.90" | 900 m || 
|-id=808 bgcolor=#E9E9E9
| 577808 ||  || — || August 12, 2013 || Crni Vrh || S. Matičič || RAF || align=right data-sort-value="0.97" | 970 m || 
|-id=809 bgcolor=#E9E9E9
| 577809 ||  || — || September 1, 2013 || Oukaimeden || C. Rinner ||  || align=right data-sort-value="0.85" | 850 m || 
|-id=810 bgcolor=#E9E9E9
| 577810 ||  || — || February 12, 2011 || Mount Lemmon || Mount Lemmon Survey ||  || align=right | 2.0 km || 
|-id=811 bgcolor=#E9E9E9
| 577811 ||  || — || August 9, 2013 || Kitt Peak || Spacewatch ||  || align=right | 1.2 km || 
|-id=812 bgcolor=#E9E9E9
| 577812 ||  || — || November 25, 2005 || Mount Lemmon || Mount Lemmon Survey ||  || align=right | 1.8 km || 
|-id=813 bgcolor=#E9E9E9
| 577813 ||  || — || March 8, 2008 || Mount Lemmon || Mount Lemmon Survey ||  || align=right data-sort-value="0.73" | 730 m || 
|-id=814 bgcolor=#E9E9E9
| 577814 ||  || — || January 31, 2011 || Bergisch Gladbach || W. Bickel || WIT || align=right data-sort-value="0.84" | 840 m || 
|-id=815 bgcolor=#E9E9E9
| 577815 ||  || — || September 4, 2000 || Kitt Peak || Spacewatch ||  || align=right | 1.3 km || 
|-id=816 bgcolor=#E9E9E9
| 577816 ||  || — || March 11, 2003 || Kitt Peak || Spacewatch ||  || align=right | 1.6 km || 
|-id=817 bgcolor=#E9E9E9
| 577817 ||  || — || December 1, 2005 || Kitt Peak || L. H. Wasserman, R. Millis ||  || align=right data-sort-value="0.60" | 600 m || 
|-id=818 bgcolor=#E9E9E9
| 577818 ||  || — || February 10, 2011 || Mount Lemmon || Mount Lemmon Survey ||  || align=right | 1.6 km || 
|-id=819 bgcolor=#E9E9E9
| 577819 ||  || — || August 26, 2013 || Haleakala || Pan-STARRS ||  || align=right data-sort-value="0.65" | 650 m || 
|-id=820 bgcolor=#E9E9E9
| 577820 ||  || — || September 4, 2013 || Palomar || PTF ||  || align=right | 1.3 km || 
|-id=821 bgcolor=#E9E9E9
| 577821 ||  || — || February 12, 2011 || Mount Lemmon || Mount Lemmon Survey ||  || align=right | 1.3 km || 
|-id=822 bgcolor=#E9E9E9
| 577822 ||  || — || November 6, 2005 || Great Shefford || P. Birtwhistle || BRG || align=right | 1.5 km || 
|-id=823 bgcolor=#E9E9E9
| 577823 ||  || — || September 10, 2013 || Haleakala || Pan-STARRS ||  || align=right data-sort-value="0.66" | 660 m || 
|-id=824 bgcolor=#E9E9E9
| 577824 ||  || — || February 7, 2011 || Mount Lemmon || Mount Lemmon Survey ||  || align=right | 1.5 km || 
|-id=825 bgcolor=#d6d6d6
| 577825 ||  || — || October 31, 2005 || Mauna Kea || Mauna Kea Obs. ||  || align=right | 2.5 km || 
|-id=826 bgcolor=#E9E9E9
| 577826 ||  || — || June 18, 2012 || ESA OGS || ESA OGS ||  || align=right | 2.0 km || 
|-id=827 bgcolor=#E9E9E9
| 577827 ||  || — || September 6, 2013 || Palomar || PTF ||  || align=right data-sort-value="0.90" | 900 m || 
|-id=828 bgcolor=#E9E9E9
| 577828 ||  || — || October 26, 2009 || Mount Lemmon || Mount Lemmon Survey ||  || align=right | 1.9 km || 
|-id=829 bgcolor=#fefefe
| 577829 ||  || — || February 12, 2008 || Mount Lemmon || Mount Lemmon Survey ||  || align=right data-sort-value="0.97" | 970 m || 
|-id=830 bgcolor=#E9E9E9
| 577830 ||  || — || August 14, 2013 || Haleakala || Pan-STARRS ||  || align=right | 1.2 km || 
|-id=831 bgcolor=#E9E9E9
| 577831 ||  || — || February 4, 2002 || Haleakala || AMOS ||  || align=right | 1.9 km || 
|-id=832 bgcolor=#E9E9E9
| 577832 ||  || — || November 22, 2009 || Catalina || CSS ||  || align=right data-sort-value="0.84" | 840 m || 
|-id=833 bgcolor=#E9E9E9
| 577833 ||  || — || February 6, 2002 || Kitt Peak || R. Millis, M. W. Buie ||  || align=right | 2.3 km || 
|-id=834 bgcolor=#E9E9E9
| 577834 ||  || — || January 31, 2003 || Anderson Mesa || LONEOS || EUN || align=right | 1.7 km || 
|-id=835 bgcolor=#E9E9E9
| 577835 ||  || — || October 11, 2009 || Mount Lemmon || Mount Lemmon Survey ||  || align=right | 1.3 km || 
|-id=836 bgcolor=#fefefe
| 577836 ||  || — || September 5, 2013 || Kitt Peak || Spacewatch ||  || align=right data-sort-value="0.59" | 590 m || 
|-id=837 bgcolor=#E9E9E9
| 577837 ||  || — || September 6, 2013 || Kitt Peak || Spacewatch ||  || align=right data-sort-value="0.93" | 930 m || 
|-id=838 bgcolor=#E9E9E9
| 577838 ||  || — || January 27, 2007 || Mount Lemmon || Mount Lemmon Survey ||  || align=right data-sort-value="0.87" | 870 m || 
|-id=839 bgcolor=#E9E9E9
| 577839 ||  || — || September 14, 2013 || Palomar || PTF ||  || align=right | 1.8 km || 
|-id=840 bgcolor=#E9E9E9
| 577840 ||  || — || September 2, 2013 || Palomar || PTF || GEF || align=right | 1.1 km || 
|-id=841 bgcolor=#C2FFFF
| 577841 ||  || — || September 3, 2013 || Calar Alto || F. Hormuth || L5 || align=right | 7.7 km || 
|-id=842 bgcolor=#C2FFFF
| 577842 ||  || — || August 28, 2000 || Cerro Tololo || R. Millis, L. H. Wasserman || L5 || align=right | 7.3 km || 
|-id=843 bgcolor=#E9E9E9
| 577843 ||  || — || September 15, 2013 || Mount Lemmon || Mount Lemmon Survey ||  || align=right data-sort-value="0.93" | 930 m || 
|-id=844 bgcolor=#E9E9E9
| 577844 ||  || — || September 4, 2000 || Kitt Peak || Spacewatch ||  || align=right | 1.6 km || 
|-id=845 bgcolor=#E9E9E9
| 577845 ||  || — || November 21, 2005 || Kitt Peak || Spacewatch ||  || align=right | 1.3 km || 
|-id=846 bgcolor=#E9E9E9
| 577846 ||  || — || September 6, 2013 || Crni Vrh || H. Mikuž ||  || align=right | 1.0 km || 
|-id=847 bgcolor=#E9E9E9
| 577847 ||  || — || September 14, 2013 || Mount Lemmon || Mount Lemmon Survey ||  || align=right data-sort-value="0.63" | 630 m || 
|-id=848 bgcolor=#E9E9E9
| 577848 ||  || — || December 1, 2014 || Haleakala || Pan-STARRS ||  || align=right data-sort-value="0.85" | 850 m || 
|-id=849 bgcolor=#d6d6d6
| 577849 ||  || — || September 13, 2013 || Mount Lemmon || Mount Lemmon Survey ||  || align=right | 2.4 km || 
|-id=850 bgcolor=#E9E9E9
| 577850 ||  || — || September 15, 2013 || Mount Lemmon || Mount Lemmon Survey ||  || align=right | 1.3 km || 
|-id=851 bgcolor=#E9E9E9
| 577851 ||  || — || March 7, 2016 || Haleakala || Pan-STARRS ||  || align=right data-sort-value="0.94" | 940 m || 
|-id=852 bgcolor=#E9E9E9
| 577852 ||  || — || September 2, 2013 || Mount Lemmon || Mount Lemmon Survey ||  || align=right | 1.5 km || 
|-id=853 bgcolor=#C2FFFF
| 577853 ||  || — || September 14, 2013 || Haleakala || Pan-STARRS || L5 || align=right | 6.9 km || 
|-id=854 bgcolor=#E9E9E9
| 577854 ||  || — || September 15, 2013 || Mount Lemmon || Mount Lemmon Survey ||  || align=right | 1.2 km || 
|-id=855 bgcolor=#d6d6d6
| 577855 ||  || — || September 14, 2013 || Kitt Peak || Spacewatch ||  || align=right | 2.3 km || 
|-id=856 bgcolor=#E9E9E9
| 577856 ||  || — || September 9, 2013 || Haleakala || Pan-STARRS ||  || align=right | 1.7 km || 
|-id=857 bgcolor=#E9E9E9
| 577857 ||  || — || September 3, 2013 || Mount Lemmon || Mount Lemmon Survey ||  || align=right | 1.8 km || 
|-id=858 bgcolor=#E9E9E9
| 577858 ||  || — || September 29, 2009 || Kitt Peak || Spacewatch ||  || align=right | 1.5 km || 
|-id=859 bgcolor=#E9E9E9
| 577859 ||  || — || October 24, 2005 || Mauna Kea || Mauna Kea Obs. ||  || align=right | 2.3 km || 
|-id=860 bgcolor=#E9E9E9
| 577860 ||  || — || January 24, 2015 || Haleakala || Pan-STARRS ||  || align=right | 1.1 km || 
|-id=861 bgcolor=#fefefe
| 577861 ||  || — || February 20, 2006 || Catalina || CSS || H || align=right data-sort-value="0.62" | 620 m || 
|-id=862 bgcolor=#E9E9E9
| 577862 ||  || — || December 5, 2010 || Mount Lemmon || Mount Lemmon Survey ||  || align=right | 1.9 km || 
|-id=863 bgcolor=#E9E9E9
| 577863 ||  || — || September 17, 2013 || Mount Lemmon || Mount Lemmon Survey ||  || align=right data-sort-value="0.77" | 770 m || 
|-id=864 bgcolor=#fefefe
| 577864 ||  || — || September 29, 2005 || Catalina || CSS || H || align=right data-sort-value="0.65" | 650 m || 
|-id=865 bgcolor=#E9E9E9
| 577865 ||  || — || May 27, 2012 || Mount Lemmon || Mount Lemmon Survey ||  || align=right | 1.0 km || 
|-id=866 bgcolor=#E9E9E9
| 577866 ||  || — || September 28, 2013 || Oukaimeden || C. Rinner ||  || align=right | 1.5 km || 
|-id=867 bgcolor=#E9E9E9
| 577867 ||  || — || August 22, 2004 || Siding Spring || SSS ||  || align=right | 1.3 km || 
|-id=868 bgcolor=#fefefe
| 577868 ||  || — || February 10, 2004 || Nogales || P. R. Holvorcem, M. Schwartz ||  || align=right data-sort-value="0.90" | 900 m || 
|-id=869 bgcolor=#E9E9E9
| 577869 ||  || — || February 25, 2011 || Mount Lemmon || Mount Lemmon Survey ||  || align=right | 1.9 km || 
|-id=870 bgcolor=#fefefe
| 577870 ||  || — || July 17, 2001 || Palomar || NEAT ||  || align=right data-sort-value="0.69" | 690 m || 
|-id=871 bgcolor=#E9E9E9
| 577871 ||  || — || September 1, 2013 || Mount Lemmon || Mount Lemmon Survey ||  || align=right | 1.5 km || 
|-id=872 bgcolor=#E9E9E9
| 577872 ||  || — || November 1, 2005 || Socorro || LINEAR ||  || align=right | 1.2 km || 
|-id=873 bgcolor=#E9E9E9
| 577873 ||  || — || September 6, 2013 || Mount Lemmon || Mount Lemmon Survey ||  || align=right | 1.7 km || 
|-id=874 bgcolor=#d6d6d6
| 577874 ||  || — || September 1, 2013 || Mount Lemmon || Mount Lemmon Survey ||  || align=right | 1.8 km || 
|-id=875 bgcolor=#d6d6d6
| 577875 ||  || — || September 1, 2013 || Mount Lemmon || Mount Lemmon Survey ||  || align=right | 1.8 km || 
|-id=876 bgcolor=#E9E9E9
| 577876 ||  || — || September 18, 2009 || Kitt Peak || Spacewatch ||  || align=right data-sort-value="0.71" | 710 m || 
|-id=877 bgcolor=#E9E9E9
| 577877 ||  || — || April 12, 2012 || Haleakala || Pan-STARRS ||  || align=right | 1.3 km || 
|-id=878 bgcolor=#C2FFFF
| 577878 ||  || — || March 4, 2008 || Mount Lemmon || Mount Lemmon Survey || L5 || align=right | 11 km || 
|-id=879 bgcolor=#E9E9E9
| 577879 ||  || — || November 8, 2009 || Catalina || CSS || RAF || align=right data-sort-value="0.99" | 990 m || 
|-id=880 bgcolor=#E9E9E9
| 577880 ||  || — || August 15, 2013 || Haleakala || Pan-STARRS ||  || align=right | 1.7 km || 
|-id=881 bgcolor=#E9E9E9
| 577881 Pálinkáslibor ||  ||  || September 27, 2013 || Piszkesteto || T. Csörgei, K. Sárneczky ||  || align=right | 1.0 km || 
|-id=882 bgcolor=#E9E9E9
| 577882 ||  || — || October 14, 2009 || Mayhill || A. Lowe ||  || align=right | 1.1 km || 
|-id=883 bgcolor=#E9E9E9
| 577883 ||  || — || August 30, 2009 || Zelenchukskaya Stn || T. V. Kryachko, B. Satovski || HNS || align=right | 1.2 km || 
|-id=884 bgcolor=#E9E9E9
| 577884 ||  || — || March 6, 2002 || Palomar || NEAT ||  || align=right | 2.9 km || 
|-id=885 bgcolor=#fefefe
| 577885 ||  || — || March 2, 2009 || Mount Lemmon || Mount Lemmon Survey ||  || align=right data-sort-value="0.65" | 650 m || 
|-id=886 bgcolor=#E9E9E9
| 577886 ||  || — || September 28, 2013 || Mount Lemmon || Mount Lemmon Survey ||  || align=right | 1.2 km || 
|-id=887 bgcolor=#E9E9E9
| 577887 ||  || — || March 10, 2007 || Mount Lemmon || Mount Lemmon Survey ||  || align=right data-sort-value="0.81" | 810 m || 
|-id=888 bgcolor=#E9E9E9
| 577888 ||  || — || September 28, 2013 || Haleakala || Pan-STARRS ||  || align=right | 1.2 km || 
|-id=889 bgcolor=#E9E9E9
| 577889 ||  || — || April 4, 2008 || Kitt Peak || Spacewatch ||  || align=right data-sort-value="0.79" | 790 m || 
|-id=890 bgcolor=#E9E9E9
| 577890 ||  || — || August 25, 2004 || Kitt Peak || Spacewatch ||  || align=right | 1.6 km || 
|-id=891 bgcolor=#E9E9E9
| 577891 ||  || — || December 3, 2005 || Mauna Kea || Mauna Kea Obs. ||  || align=right | 2.3 km || 
|-id=892 bgcolor=#E9E9E9
| 577892 ||  || — || September 18, 2009 || Kitt Peak || Spacewatch ||  || align=right data-sort-value="0.67" | 670 m || 
|-id=893 bgcolor=#E9E9E9
| 577893 ||  || — || January 28, 2011 || Catalina || CSS ||  || align=right | 1.4 km || 
|-id=894 bgcolor=#E9E9E9
| 577894 ||  || — || April 14, 2007 || Mount Lemmon || Mount Lemmon Survey || WIT || align=right | 1.3 km || 
|-id=895 bgcolor=#E9E9E9
| 577895 ||  || — || February 4, 2003 || Anderson Mesa || LONEOS || (194) || align=right | 1.8 km || 
|-id=896 bgcolor=#E9E9E9
| 577896 ||  || — || March 13, 2007 || Kitt Peak || Spacewatch ||  || align=right | 1.5 km || 
|-id=897 bgcolor=#E9E9E9
| 577897 ||  || — || November 9, 2009 || Mount Lemmon || Mount Lemmon Survey ||  || align=right | 2.1 km || 
|-id=898 bgcolor=#E9E9E9
| 577898 ||  || — || September 28, 2013 || Piszkesteto || K. Sárneczky ||  || align=right data-sort-value="0.90" | 900 m || 
|-id=899 bgcolor=#E9E9E9
| 577899 ||  || — || September 30, 2013 || Mount Lemmon || Mount Lemmon Survey ||  || align=right | 1.7 km || 
|-id=900 bgcolor=#E9E9E9
| 577900 ||  || — || May 5, 2016 || Mount Lemmon || Mount Lemmon Survey ||  || align=right data-sort-value="0.92" | 920 m || 
|}

577901–578000 

|-bgcolor=#E9E9E9
| 577901 ||  || — || September 28, 2013 || Piszkesteto || K. Sárneczky ||  || align=right | 1.1 km || 
|-id=902 bgcolor=#E9E9E9
| 577902 ||  || — || September 6, 2013 || Kitt Peak || Spacewatch ||  || align=right data-sort-value="0.95" | 950 m || 
|-id=903 bgcolor=#E9E9E9
| 577903 ||  || — || October 1, 2013 || Palomar || PTF ||  || align=right | 1.2 km || 
|-id=904 bgcolor=#E9E9E9
| 577904 ||  || — || September 2, 2013 || Catalina || CSS ||  || align=right | 1.4 km || 
|-id=905 bgcolor=#E9E9E9
| 577905 ||  || — || August 20, 2004 || Siding Spring || SSS ||  || align=right | 2.0 km || 
|-id=906 bgcolor=#E9E9E9
| 577906 ||  || — || October 3, 2013 || Palomar || PTF ||  || align=right | 1.8 km || 
|-id=907 bgcolor=#E9E9E9
| 577907 ||  || — || September 24, 2000 || Kitt Peak || Spacewatch ||  || align=right | 1.6 km || 
|-id=908 bgcolor=#E9E9E9
| 577908 ||  || — || January 30, 2006 || Kitt Peak || Spacewatch ||  || align=right | 1.7 km || 
|-id=909 bgcolor=#E9E9E9
| 577909 ||  || — || October 1, 2013 || Kitt Peak || Spacewatch ||  || align=right | 1.1 km || 
|-id=910 bgcolor=#E9E9E9
| 577910 ||  || — || March 10, 2003 || Palomar || NEAT ||  || align=right | 1.1 km || 
|-id=911 bgcolor=#E9E9E9
| 577911 ||  || — || May 12, 2007 || Mount Lemmon || Mount Lemmon Survey ||  || align=right | 1.8 km || 
|-id=912 bgcolor=#E9E9E9
| 577912 ||  || — || September 17, 2013 || Mount Lemmon || Mount Lemmon Survey ||  || align=right | 2.0 km || 
|-id=913 bgcolor=#C2FFFF
| 577913 ||  || — || December 19, 2004 || Mount Lemmon || Mount Lemmon Survey || L5 || align=right | 11 km || 
|-id=914 bgcolor=#fefefe
| 577914 ||  || — || August 31, 2013 || Haleakala || Pan-STARRS ||  || align=right data-sort-value="0.60" | 600 m || 
|-id=915 bgcolor=#E9E9E9
| 577915 ||  || — || March 10, 2011 || Kitt Peak || Spacewatch ||  || align=right | 1.7 km || 
|-id=916 bgcolor=#E9E9E9
| 577916 ||  || — || October 2, 2013 || Palomar || PTF ||  || align=right | 1.5 km || 
|-id=917 bgcolor=#E9E9E9
| 577917 ||  || — || September 17, 2009 || Mount Lemmon || Mount Lemmon Survey ||  || align=right data-sort-value="0.81" | 810 m || 
|-id=918 bgcolor=#E9E9E9
| 577918 ||  || — || October 2, 2013 || Mount Lemmon || Mount Lemmon Survey ||  || align=right | 1.3 km || 
|-id=919 bgcolor=#E9E9E9
| 577919 ||  || — || October 2, 2013 || Mount Lemmon || Mount Lemmon Survey ||  || align=right data-sort-value="0.98" | 980 m || 
|-id=920 bgcolor=#E9E9E9
| 577920 ||  || — || September 13, 2013 || Mount Lemmon || Mount Lemmon Survey ||  || align=right data-sort-value="0.83" | 830 m || 
|-id=921 bgcolor=#E9E9E9
| 577921 ||  || — || March 20, 2007 || Mount Lemmon || Mount Lemmon Survey ||  || align=right | 1.9 km || 
|-id=922 bgcolor=#E9E9E9
| 577922 ||  || — || January 10, 2006 || Kitt Peak || Spacewatch ||  || align=right | 2.0 km || 
|-id=923 bgcolor=#d6d6d6
| 577923 ||  || — || September 9, 2008 || Mount Lemmon || Mount Lemmon Survey ||  || align=right | 2.0 km || 
|-id=924 bgcolor=#E9E9E9
| 577924 ||  || — || October 4, 2013 || Mount Lemmon || Mount Lemmon Survey ||  || align=right | 1.7 km || 
|-id=925 bgcolor=#E9E9E9
| 577925 ||  || — || November 5, 1999 || Kitt Peak || Spacewatch || AGN || align=right | 1.3 km || 
|-id=926 bgcolor=#E9E9E9
| 577926 ||  || — || April 1, 2012 || Mount Lemmon || Mount Lemmon Survey ||  || align=right data-sort-value="0.80" | 800 m || 
|-id=927 bgcolor=#fefefe
| 577927 ||  || — || November 24, 2008 || Kitt Peak || Spacewatch || H || align=right data-sort-value="0.67" | 670 m || 
|-id=928 bgcolor=#E9E9E9
| 577928 ||  || — || October 1, 2013 || Mount Lemmon || Mount Lemmon Survey ||  || align=right | 2.0 km || 
|-id=929 bgcolor=#E9E9E9
| 577929 ||  || — || October 1, 2013 || Kitt Peak || Spacewatch ||  || align=right | 1.3 km || 
|-id=930 bgcolor=#E9E9E9
| 577930 ||  || — || October 2, 2013 || Kitt Peak || Spacewatch ||  || align=right data-sort-value="0.77" | 770 m || 
|-id=931 bgcolor=#C2FFFF
| 577931 ||  || — || October 2, 2013 || Mount Lemmon || Mount Lemmon Survey || L5 || align=right | 7.6 km || 
|-id=932 bgcolor=#E9E9E9
| 577932 ||  || — || October 3, 2013 || Kitt Peak || Spacewatch ||  || align=right data-sort-value="0.98" | 980 m || 
|-id=933 bgcolor=#E9E9E9
| 577933 ||  || — || September 28, 2013 || Piszkesteto || K. Sárneczky ||  || align=right | 2.7 km || 
|-id=934 bgcolor=#E9E9E9
| 577934 ||  || — || September 12, 2004 || Kitt Peak || Spacewatch ||  || align=right | 1.4 km || 
|-id=935 bgcolor=#E9E9E9
| 577935 ||  || — || July 29, 2008 || Mount Lemmon || Mount Lemmon Survey ||  || align=right | 1.5 km || 
|-id=936 bgcolor=#E9E9E9
| 577936 ||  || — || October 10, 2004 || Kitt Peak || L. H. Wasserman, J. R. Lovering ||  || align=right | 1.8 km || 
|-id=937 bgcolor=#E9E9E9
| 577937 ||  || — || April 2, 2011 || Mount Lemmon || Mount Lemmon Survey ||  || align=right | 1.7 km || 
|-id=938 bgcolor=#E9E9E9
| 577938 ||  || — || October 26, 2009 || Kitt Peak || Spacewatch ||  || align=right data-sort-value="0.83" | 830 m || 
|-id=939 bgcolor=#E9E9E9
| 577939 ||  || — || September 17, 2009 || Kitt Peak || Spacewatch ||  || align=right data-sort-value="0.76" | 760 m || 
|-id=940 bgcolor=#E9E9E9
| 577940 ||  || — || January 22, 2006 || Mount Lemmon || Mount Lemmon Survey ||  || align=right | 1.8 km || 
|-id=941 bgcolor=#E9E9E9
| 577941 ||  || — || October 6, 2013 || Oukaimeden || C. Rinner ||  || align=right | 1.8 km || 
|-id=942 bgcolor=#E9E9E9
| 577942 ||  || — || October 8, 2013 || Cala d'Hort || Cala d'Hort Obs. ||  || align=right data-sort-value="0.90" | 900 m || 
|-id=943 bgcolor=#E9E9E9
| 577943 ||  || — || October 7, 2013 || Palomar || PTF ||  || align=right | 1.6 km || 
|-id=944 bgcolor=#E9E9E9
| 577944 ||  || — || October 9, 2013 || Elena Remote || A. Oreshko ||  || align=right | 1.7 km || 
|-id=945 bgcolor=#E9E9E9
| 577945 ||  || — || March 14, 2007 || Mount Lemmon || Mount Lemmon Survey ||  || align=right | 1.1 km || 
|-id=946 bgcolor=#E9E9E9
| 577946 ||  || — || February 21, 2003 || Palomar || NEAT ||  || align=right | 1.7 km || 
|-id=947 bgcolor=#E9E9E9
| 577947 ||  || — || October 15, 2013 || Catalina || CSS ||  || align=right | 1.7 km || 
|-id=948 bgcolor=#E9E9E9
| 577948 ||  || — || April 5, 2011 || Mount Lemmon || Mount Lemmon Survey ||  || align=right | 1.6 km || 
|-id=949 bgcolor=#E9E9E9
| 577949 ||  || — || November 9, 2013 || Haleakala || Pan-STARRS ||  || align=right | 1.2 km || 
|-id=950 bgcolor=#fefefe
| 577950 ||  || — || October 8, 2013 || Mount Lemmon || Mount Lemmon Survey || H || align=right data-sort-value="0.47" | 470 m || 
|-id=951 bgcolor=#E9E9E9
| 577951 ||  || — || October 3, 2013 || Kitt Peak || Spacewatch ||  || align=right | 1.8 km || 
|-id=952 bgcolor=#E9E9E9
| 577952 ||  || — || October 2, 2013 || Kitt Peak || Spacewatch ||  || align=right | 1.2 km || 
|-id=953 bgcolor=#E9E9E9
| 577953 ||  || — || October 3, 2013 || Haleakala || Pan-STARRS ||  || align=right | 1.4 km || 
|-id=954 bgcolor=#E9E9E9
| 577954 ||  || — || October 9, 2013 || Mount Lemmon || Mount Lemmon Survey ||  || align=right | 1.2 km || 
|-id=955 bgcolor=#E9E9E9
| 577955 ||  || — || May 18, 2002 || Palomar || NEAT ||  || align=right | 3.3 km || 
|-id=956 bgcolor=#E9E9E9
| 577956 ||  || — || October 3, 2013 || Haleakala || Pan-STARRS ||  || align=right | 1.4 km || 
|-id=957 bgcolor=#fefefe
| 577957 ||  || — || September 17, 2009 || Kitt Peak || Spacewatch ||  || align=right data-sort-value="0.64" | 640 m || 
|-id=958 bgcolor=#E9E9E9
| 577958 ||  || — || September 9, 2004 || Kitt Peak || Spacewatch ||  || align=right | 1.4 km || 
|-id=959 bgcolor=#E9E9E9
| 577959 ||  || — || August 27, 2000 || Cerro Tololo || R. Millis, L. H. Wasserman ||  || align=right | 1.1 km || 
|-id=960 bgcolor=#E9E9E9
| 577960 ||  || — || October 3, 2013 || Haleakala || Pan-STARRS ||  || align=right | 1.7 km || 
|-id=961 bgcolor=#E9E9E9
| 577961 ||  || — || October 7, 2013 || Nogales || M. Schwartz, P. R. Holvorcem ||  || align=right | 1.0 km || 
|-id=962 bgcolor=#E9E9E9
| 577962 ||  || — || October 7, 2013 || Mount Lemmon || Mount Lemmon Survey ||  || align=right | 1.4 km || 
|-id=963 bgcolor=#E9E9E9
| 577963 ||  || — || October 14, 2013 || Mount Lemmon || Mount Lemmon Survey ||  || align=right | 2.2 km || 
|-id=964 bgcolor=#E9E9E9
| 577964 ||  || — || December 12, 2004 || Kitt Peak || Spacewatch ||  || align=right | 2.4 km || 
|-id=965 bgcolor=#E9E9E9
| 577965 ||  || — || October 5, 2013 || Haleakala || Pan-STARRS ||  || align=right | 1.5 km || 
|-id=966 bgcolor=#E9E9E9
| 577966 ||  || — || October 5, 2013 || Haleakala || Pan-STARRS ||  || align=right | 1.5 km || 
|-id=967 bgcolor=#E9E9E9
| 577967 ||  || — || October 3, 2013 || Haleakala || Pan-STARRS ||  || align=right | 1.8 km || 
|-id=968 bgcolor=#fefefe
| 577968 ||  || — || February 20, 2015 || Haleakala || Pan-STARRS ||  || align=right data-sort-value="0.75" | 750 m || 
|-id=969 bgcolor=#d6d6d6
| 577969 ||  || — || September 6, 2008 || Kitt Peak || Spacewatch ||  || align=right | 1.5 km || 
|-id=970 bgcolor=#E9E9E9
| 577970 ||  || — || October 1, 2013 || Mount Lemmon || Mount Lemmon Survey ||  || align=right | 1.3 km || 
|-id=971 bgcolor=#C2FFFF
| 577971 ||  || — || October 5, 2013 || Haleakala || Pan-STARRS || L5 || align=right | 6.4 km || 
|-id=972 bgcolor=#d6d6d6
| 577972 ||  || — || October 2, 2013 || Mount Lemmon || Mount Lemmon Survey ||  || align=right | 1.7 km || 
|-id=973 bgcolor=#C2FFFF
| 577973 ||  || — || October 1, 2013 || Kitt Peak || Spacewatch || L5 || align=right | 9.7 km || 
|-id=974 bgcolor=#d6d6d6
| 577974 ||  || — || October 7, 2013 || Mount Lemmon || Mount Lemmon Survey ||  || align=right | 2.7 km || 
|-id=975 bgcolor=#E9E9E9
| 577975 ||  || — || October 3, 2013 || Kitt Peak || Spacewatch ||  || align=right | 1.7 km || 
|-id=976 bgcolor=#E9E9E9
| 577976 ||  || — || October 5, 2013 || Haleakala || Pan-STARRS ||  || align=right | 1.2 km || 
|-id=977 bgcolor=#E9E9E9
| 577977 ||  || — || October 15, 2013 || Kitt Peak || Spacewatch ||  || align=right | 1.3 km || 
|-id=978 bgcolor=#C2FFFF
| 577978 ||  || — || October 9, 2013 || Mount Lemmon || Mount Lemmon Survey || L5 || align=right | 8.8 km || 
|-id=979 bgcolor=#E9E9E9
| 577979 ||  || — || October 4, 2013 || Catalina || CSS ||  || align=right | 1.1 km || 
|-id=980 bgcolor=#E9E9E9
| 577980 ||  || — || October 3, 2013 || Haleakala || Pan-STARRS ||  || align=right | 1.5 km || 
|-id=981 bgcolor=#fefefe
| 577981 ||  || — || December 10, 2005 || Catalina || CSS || H || align=right data-sort-value="0.81" | 810 m || 
|-id=982 bgcolor=#d6d6d6
| 577982 ||  || — || September 17, 2013 || Mount Lemmon || Mount Lemmon Survey ||  || align=right | 3.2 km || 
|-id=983 bgcolor=#E9E9E9
| 577983 ||  || — || October 3, 2013 || Haleakala || Pan-STARRS ||  || align=right | 1.1 km || 
|-id=984 bgcolor=#E9E9E9
| 577984 ||  || — || September 5, 2008 || Kitt Peak || Spacewatch ||  || align=right | 1.9 km || 
|-id=985 bgcolor=#E9E9E9
| 577985 ||  || — || October 8, 2013 || Haleakala || Pan-STARRS ||  || align=right | 1.2 km || 
|-id=986 bgcolor=#E9E9E9
| 577986 ||  || — || September 28, 2013 || Piszkesteto || K. Sárneczky ||  || align=right | 1.5 km || 
|-id=987 bgcolor=#E9E9E9
| 577987 ||  || — || August 26, 2000 || Kitt Peak || Spacewatch ||  || align=right | 1.7 km || 
|-id=988 bgcolor=#E9E9E9
| 577988 ||  || — || October 30, 2013 || Haleakala || Pan-STARRS ||  || align=right | 2.2 km || 
|-id=989 bgcolor=#E9E9E9
| 577989 ||  || — || May 27, 2012 || Mount Lemmon || Mount Lemmon Survey ||  || align=right data-sort-value="0.83" | 830 m || 
|-id=990 bgcolor=#E9E9E9
| 577990 ||  || — || October 27, 2013 || Kitt Peak || Spacewatch ||  || align=right | 1.5 km || 
|-id=991 bgcolor=#E9E9E9
| 577991 ||  || — || September 17, 2003 || Kitt Peak || Spacewatch ||  || align=right | 2.3 km || 
|-id=992 bgcolor=#E9E9E9
| 577992 ||  || — || October 24, 2013 || Mount Lemmon || Mount Lemmon Survey ||  || align=right | 1.2 km || 
|-id=993 bgcolor=#E9E9E9
| 577993 ||  || — || October 25, 2013 || Kitt Peak || Spacewatch ||  || align=right | 1.1 km || 
|-id=994 bgcolor=#E9E9E9
| 577994 ||  || — || April 14, 2002 || Kitt Peak || Spacewatch ||  || align=right | 1.2 km || 
|-id=995 bgcolor=#E9E9E9
| 577995 ||  || — || April 29, 2012 || Mount Lemmon || Mount Lemmon Survey ||  || align=right data-sort-value="0.73" | 730 m || 
|-id=996 bgcolor=#E9E9E9
| 577996 ||  || — || October 25, 2013 || Mount Lemmon || Mount Lemmon Survey ||  || align=right | 1.2 km || 
|-id=997 bgcolor=#E9E9E9
| 577997 ||  || — || October 25, 2013 || Kitt Peak || Spacewatch ||  || align=right | 1.7 km || 
|-id=998 bgcolor=#E9E9E9
| 577998 ||  || — || October 26, 2013 || Mount Lemmon || Mount Lemmon Survey ||  || align=right | 1.8 km || 
|-id=999 bgcolor=#E9E9E9
| 577999 ||  || — || October 30, 2013 || Haleakala || Pan-STARRS ||  || align=right | 2.2 km || 
|-id=000 bgcolor=#E9E9E9
| 578000 ||  || — || October 24, 2013 || Mount Lemmon || Mount Lemmon Survey ||  || align=right data-sort-value="0.67" | 670 m || 
|}

References

External links 
 Discovery Circumstances: Numbered Minor Planets (575001)–(580000) (IAU Minor Planet Center)

0577